= Lunik IX =

Lunik IX may refer to:

- Luník IX, a borough in Košice, Slovakia
- Luna 9, an uncrewed space mission of the Soviet Union's Luna program (sometimes called Lunik)
