= Lunik 9 =

Lunik 9 can refer to:

- Luník IX, a borough in the city of Košice, Slovakia, with a mostly Roma population
- Luna 9, a Soviet uncrewed space mission, the first to achieve a soft landing on the Moon
