= Košice-Západ =

Košice-West Košice-Západ "Terasa" / "Nové Mesto"
- Borough
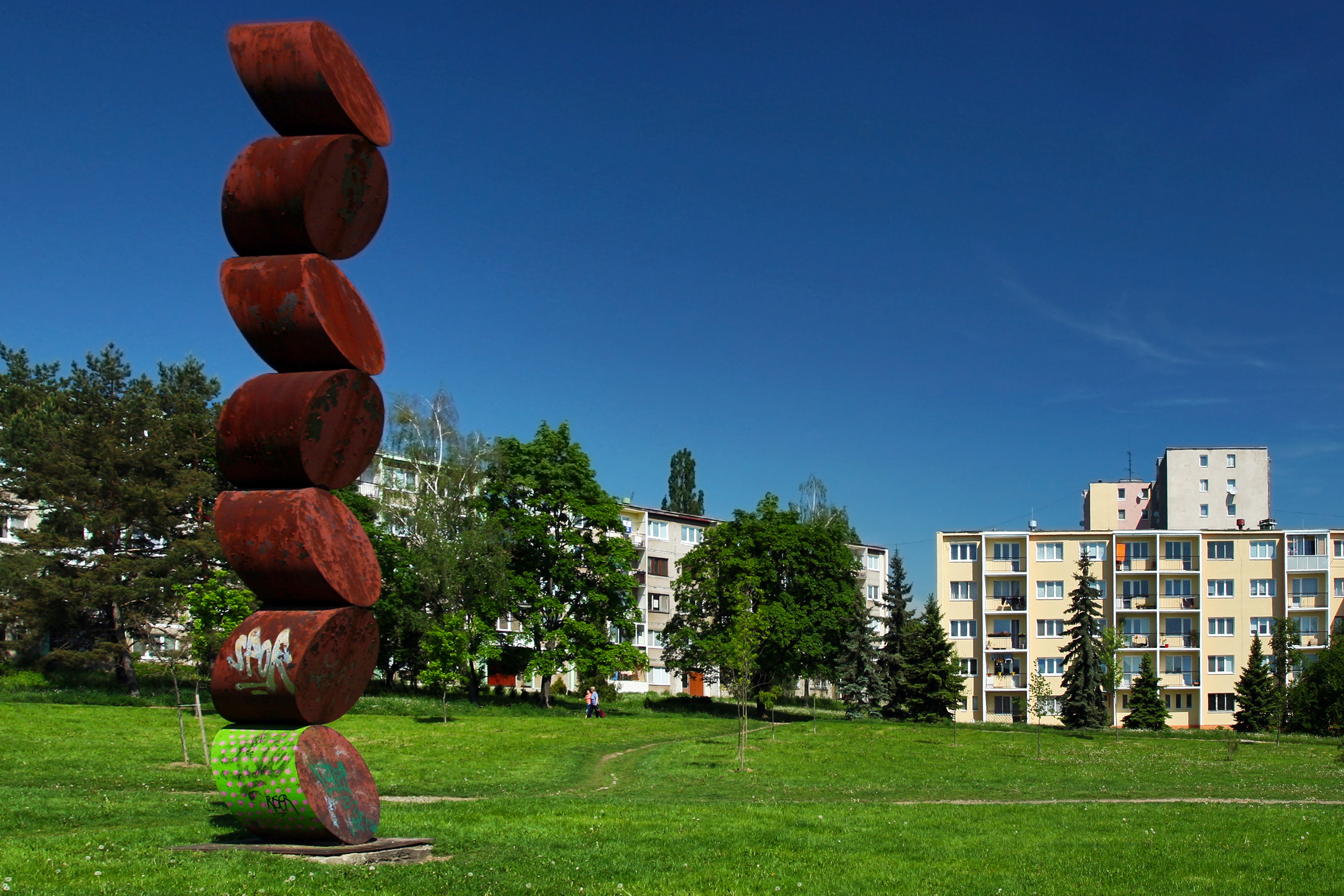
- Park and sculpture at a housing estate in Košice-Západ

- Flag Coat of arms
- Nickname: Terasa
- Location within Košice

- Location of Košice-Západ in Slovakia
- Country: Slovakia
- Region: Košice
- District: Košice II
- Borough: 22 February 1962

Area
  - Total: 5.70 km^{2} (2.20 sq mi)
- Elevation: 243 m (797 ft)

Population (2025)
  - Total: 35,899
- Time zone: UTC+1 (CET)
  - Summer (DST): UTC+2 (CEST)
- Postal code: 040 11
- Area code: +421-55
- Vehicle registration plate (until 2022): KE
- Website: www.kosicezapad.sk

Košice-Západ (literally: "Košice-West", Hungarian: Kassa-Nyugat) is a borough (city ward) of Košice, Slovakia. Located in the Košice II district, at an altitude of roughly 243 metres (797 ft) above sea level, it is the most populous borough of the entire city. It borders the borough of Old Town in the east, Košice-Sever in the north, Sídlisko KVP in the west, Luník IX in the southwest and Košice-Juh in the southeast. The area of the borough is frequently nicknamed "Terasa".

== History ==
Construction of the microdistrict began in the late 1950s and early 1960s, intended as one of the first major post-war developments in housing estate construction in Košice. The borough officially opened on the 22 February 1962. The working title for the development was Nové Mesto ("New Town"), reflecting its proximity to the nearby Old Town, but the more popular title adopted for the new borough became Terasa ("Terrace"). Currently, there are more than 39,000 people living in the borough, the highest population of all 22 boroughs of Košice.

The borough's housing estates built in the 1960s were dubbed "Luník", in honour of the Soviet Luna series of lunar probes. All of the Luník housing estates in Košice are located in the Košice-Západ borough (from Luník I to Luník VIII), the only exception being Luník IX, which forms its own borough.

== Statistics ==
- Area: 5.53 square kilometres (2.14 sq mi)
- Population: 39,978 (December 2017)
- Population density: 7,200/km² (December 2017)
- District: Košice II
- Mayor: Marcel Vrchota (as of 2018 elections)

== Geography ==
The municipality lies at an altitude of 243 metres (797 ft) and covers an area of 5.70 km^{2} (2.20 sq mi) (2025).

== Population ==
Population statistic (10 years)
| Year | 1995 | 2005 | 2015 | 2025 |
|---|---|---|---|---|
| Count | 0 | 39,869 | 40,325 | 35,899 |
| Difference | | – | +1.14% | −10.97% |

Population statistic
| Year | 2024 | 2025 |
|---|---|---|
| Count | 36,275 | 35,899 |
| Difference | | −1.03% |

It has a population of 35,899 people (31 December 2025).

=== Ethnicity ===
Census 2021 (1+ %)
| Ethnicity | Number | Fraction |
|---|---|---|
| Slovak | 32,828 | 86.98% |
| Not found out | 3234 | 8.56% |
| Hungarian | 1355 | 3.59% |
| Rusyn | 855 | 2.26% |
| Czech | 598 | 1.58% |
| Total | 37,738 | |

In year 2021 was 37,738 people by ethnicity 32,828 as Slovak, 3234 as Not found out, 1355 as Hungarian, 855 as Rusyn, 598 as Czech, 231 as Other, 186 as Romani, 165 as Ukrainian, 94 as German, 66 as Russian, 47 as Vietnamese, 37 as Polish, 31 as Moravian, 30 as Jewish, 21 as Albanian, 20 as English, 17 as Bulgarian, 12 as Serbian, 11 as Greek, 11 as French, 10 as Italian, 9 as Chinese, 9 as Romanian, 7 as Croatian, 6 as Austrian, 5 as Turkish, 3 as Irish, 3 as Canadian, 2 as Silesian and 1 as Iranian.

Note on population: The difference values of population numbers in the table "Population statistic" and in the sections "Ethnicity" & "Religion" is caused by the use of various statistical methods.

=== Religion ===
Census 2021 (1+ %)
| Religion | Number | Fraction |
|---|---|---|
| Roman Catholic Church | 15,837 | 41.97% |
| None | 11,560 | 30.63% |
| Not found out | 3718 | 9.85% |
| Greek Catholic Church | 2966 | 7.86% |
| Evangelical Church | 1330 | 3.52% |
| Calvinist Church | 767 | 2.03% |
| Eastern Orthodox Church | 573 | 1.52% |
| Total | 37,738 | |

In year 2021 was 37,738 people by religion 15,837 from Roman Catholic Church, 11,560 from None, 3718 from Not found out, 2966 from Greek Catholic Church, 1330 from Evangelical Church, 767 from Calvinist Church, 573 from Eastern Orthodox Church, 126 from Other, 117 from Ad hoc movements, 113 from Jehovah's Witnesses, 103 from Apostolic Church, 89 from Other and not ascertained christian church, 73 from Christian Congregations in Slovakia, 60 from Baptists Church, 54 from Buddhism, 47 from Islam, 44 from Jewish community, 39 from Seventh-day Adventist Church, 38 from Paganism and natural spirituality, 35 from Church of the Brethren, 21 from United Methodist Church, 9 from Hinduism, 7 from Old Catholic Church, 6 from Czechoslovak Hussite Church, 3 from Church of Jesus Christ of Latter-day Saints and 3 from Bahá'i Community.

== Gallery ==
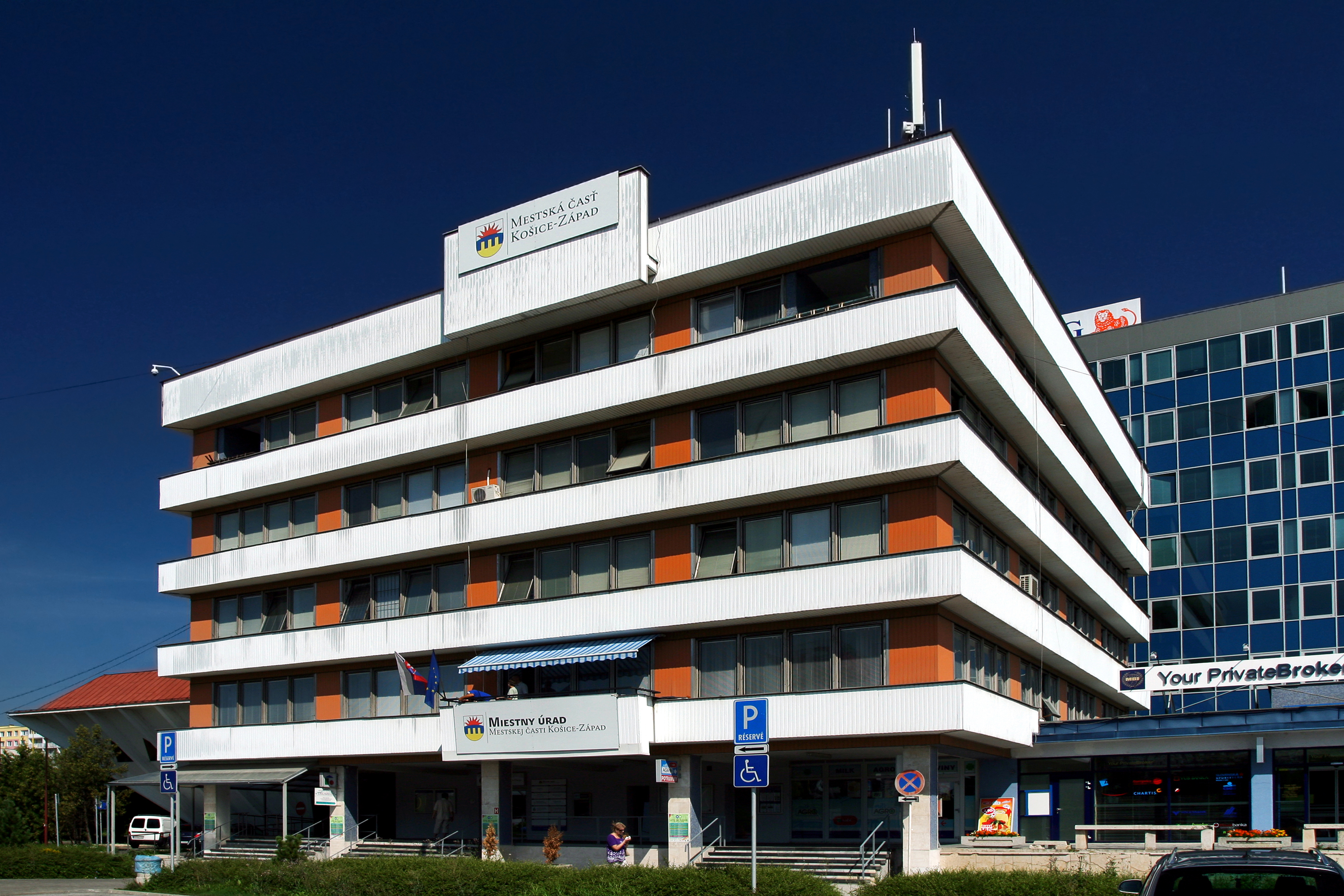
Municipal office of Košice-Západ

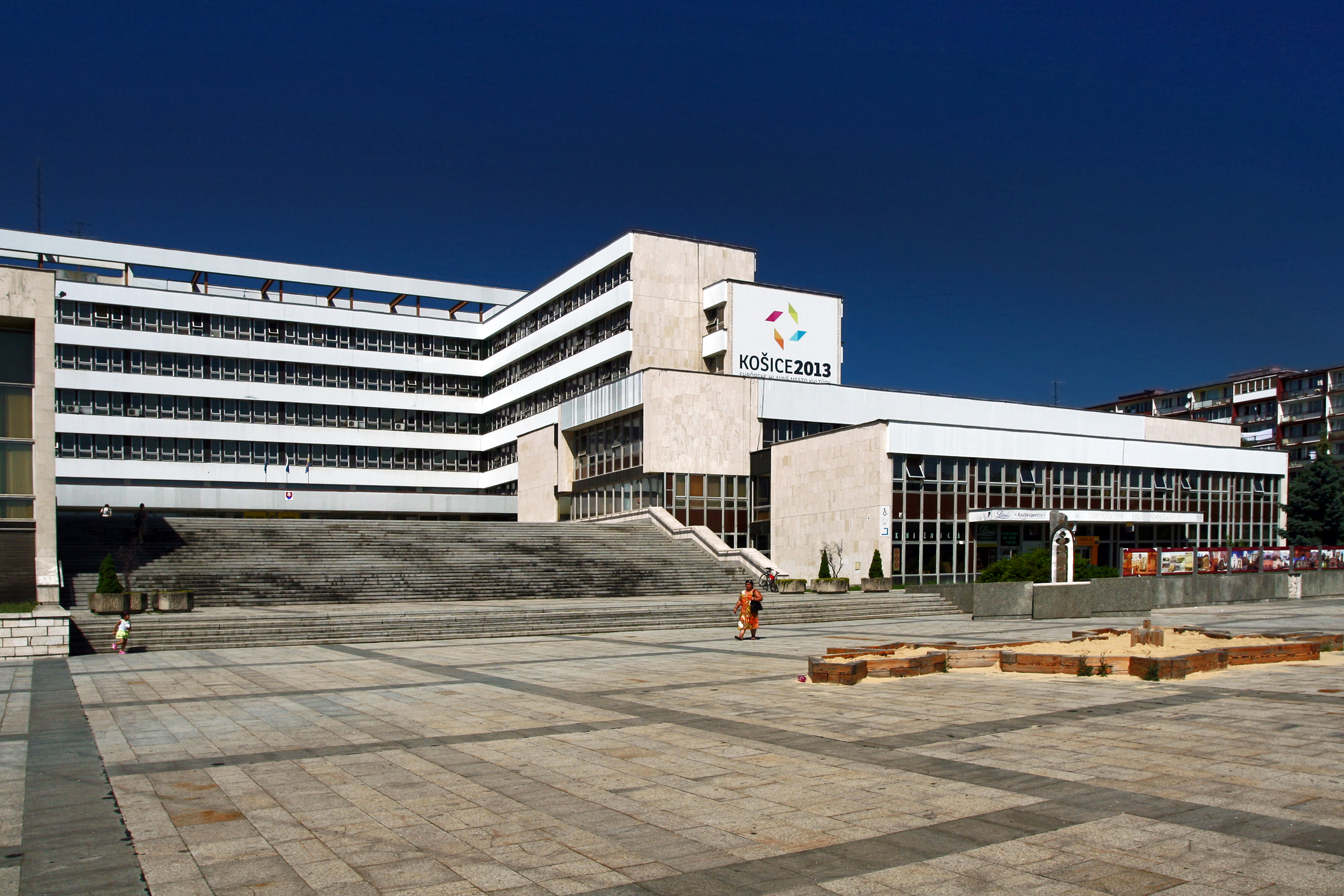
Košice City Magistrate building (nicknamed "The White House")

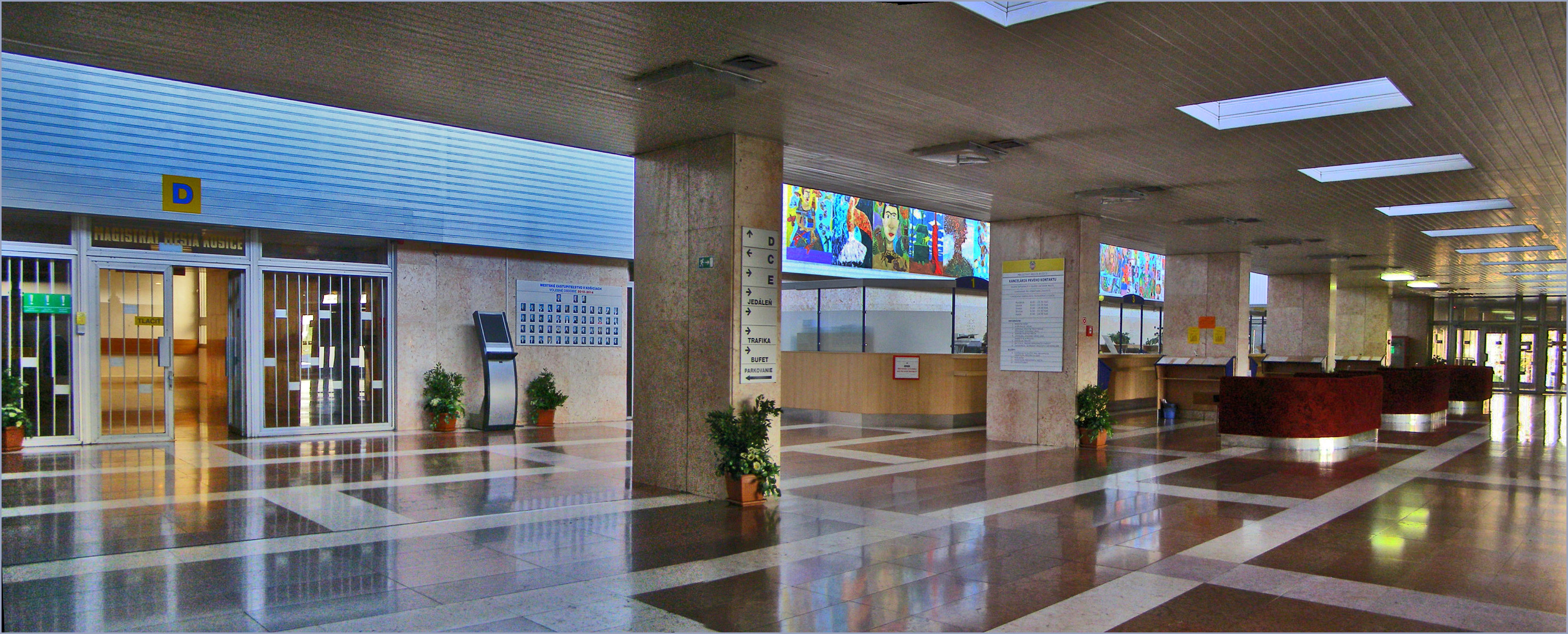
Interior of Košice City Magistrate building entrance hall

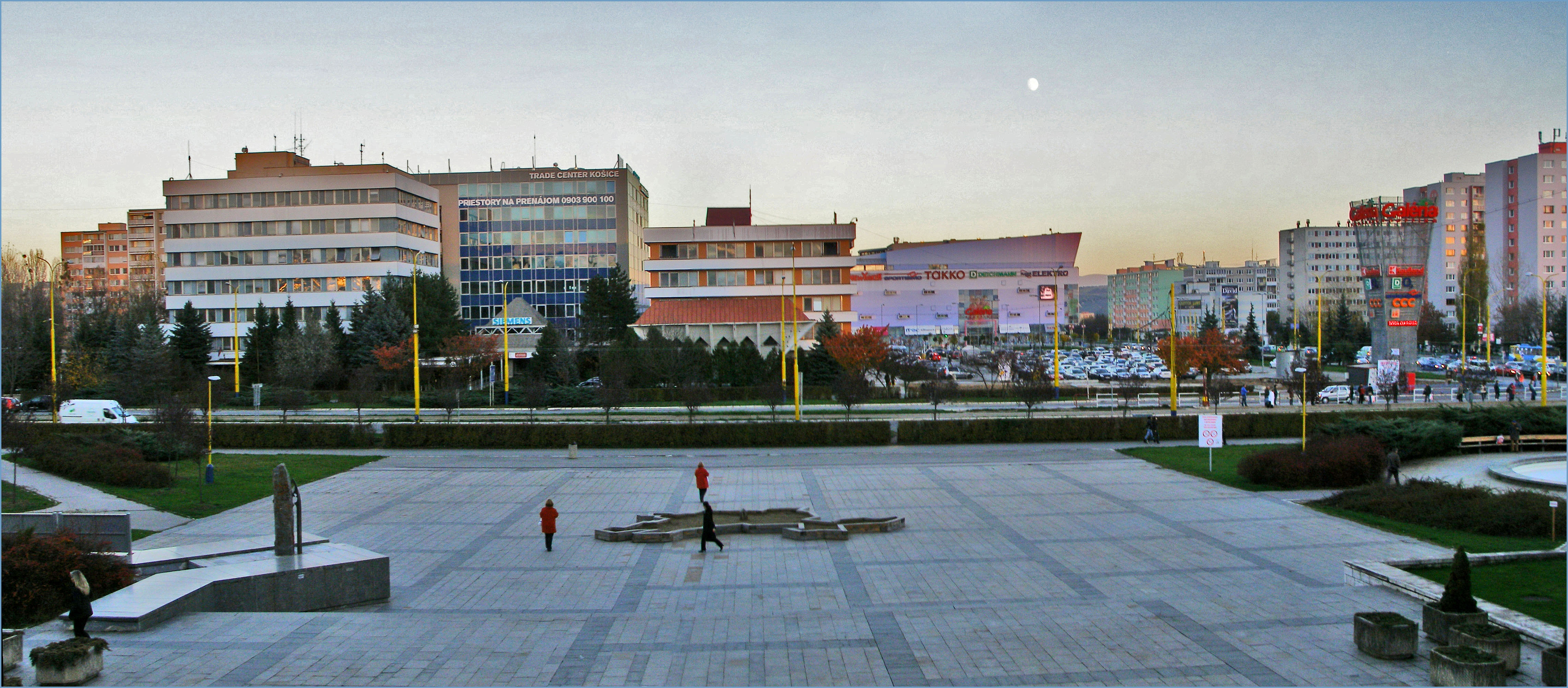
A view of the Trieda SNP (SNP Avenue) from the steps of the magistrate building

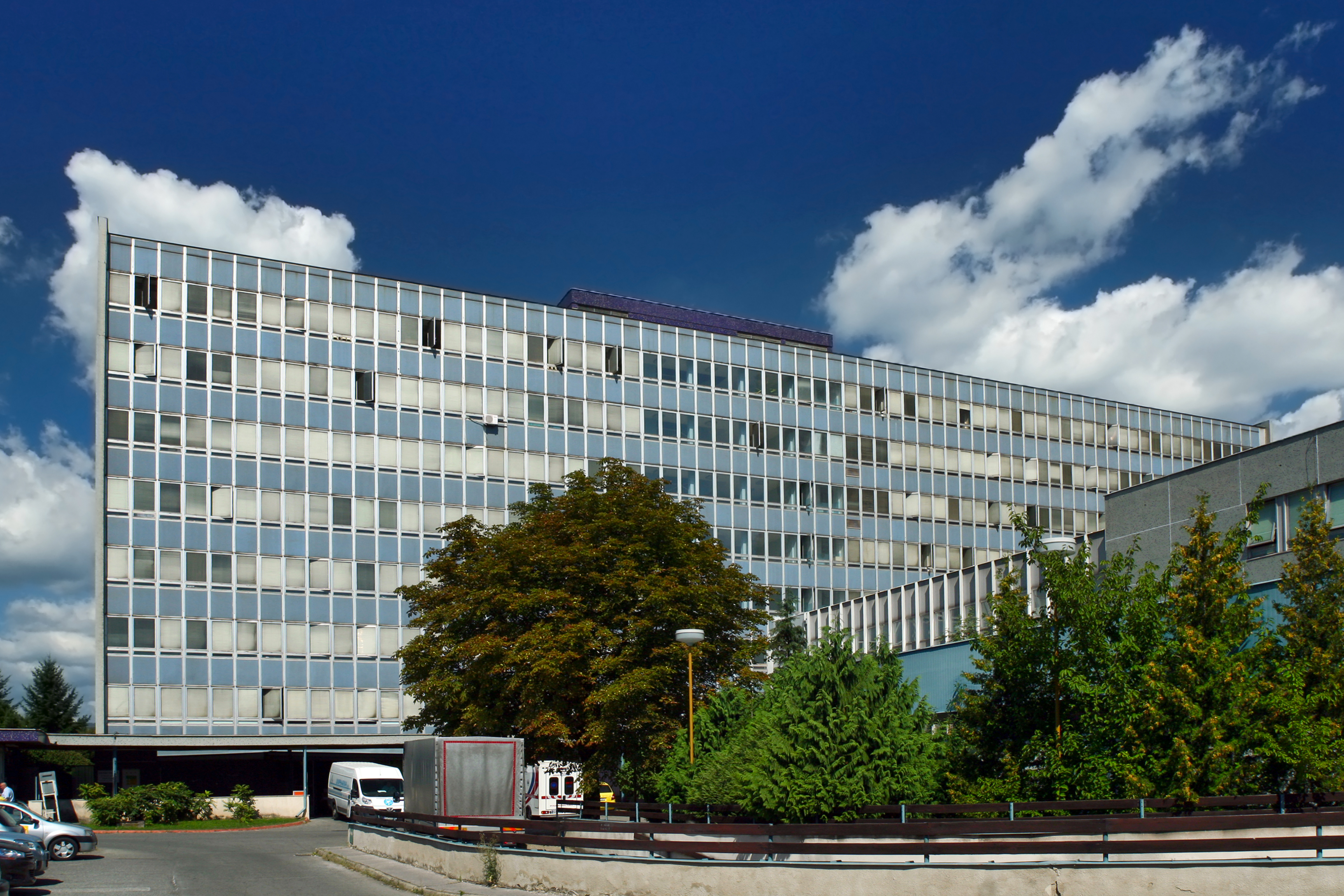
Polyclinic of the Louis Pasteur University Hospital

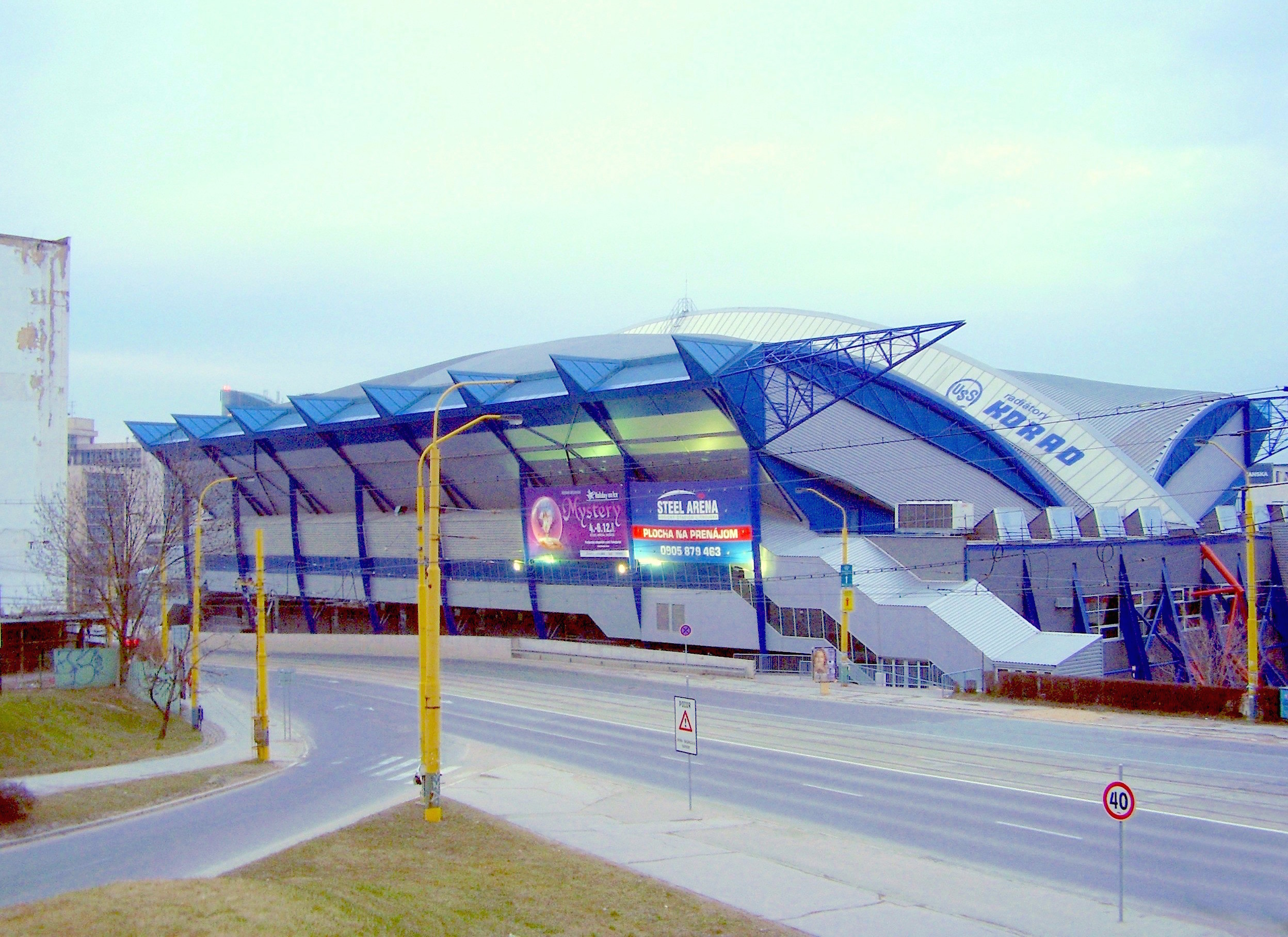
USS Steel Aréna stadium and ice rink in the borough

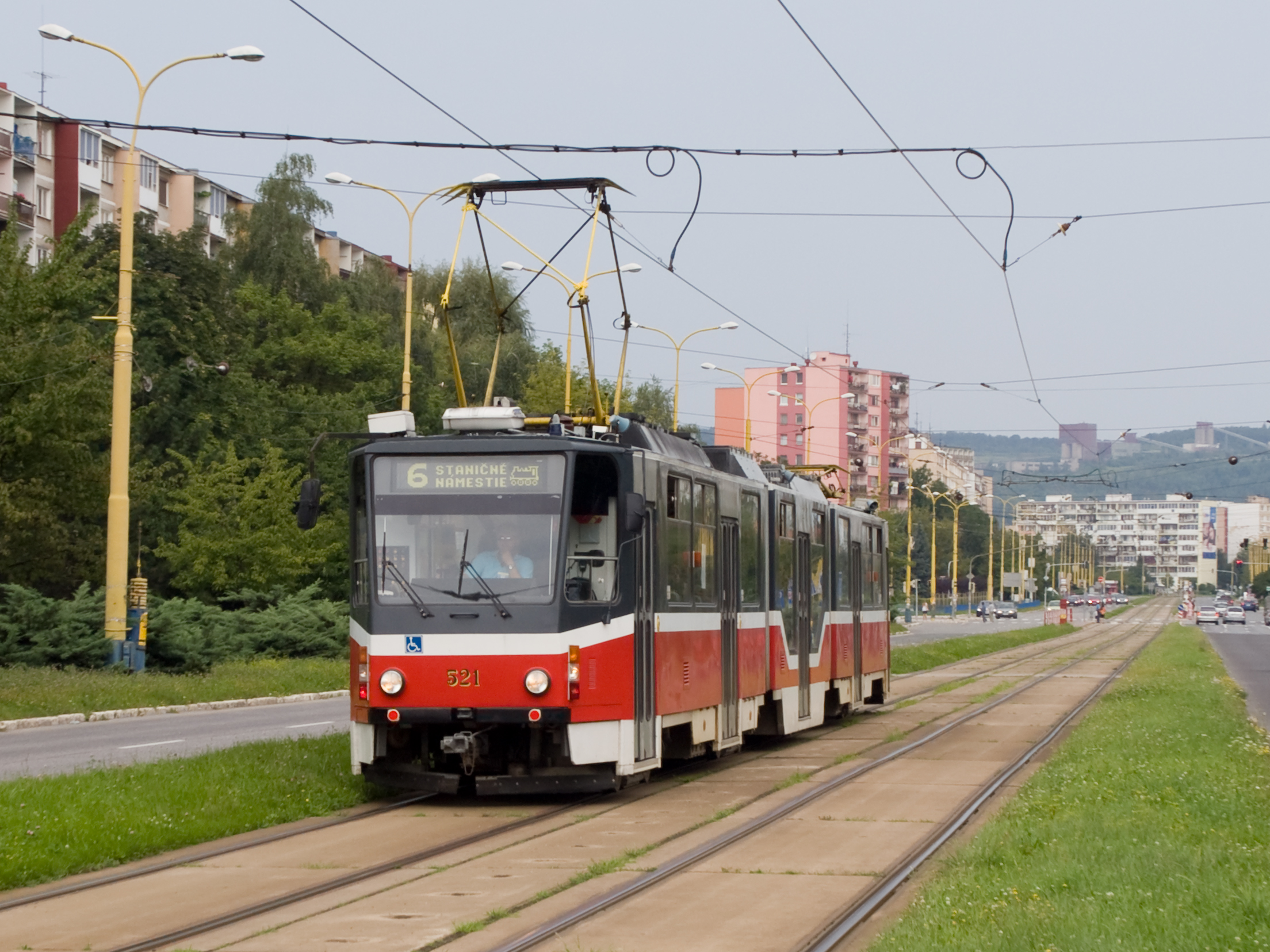
A tram on the separate tramway track of SNP Avenue

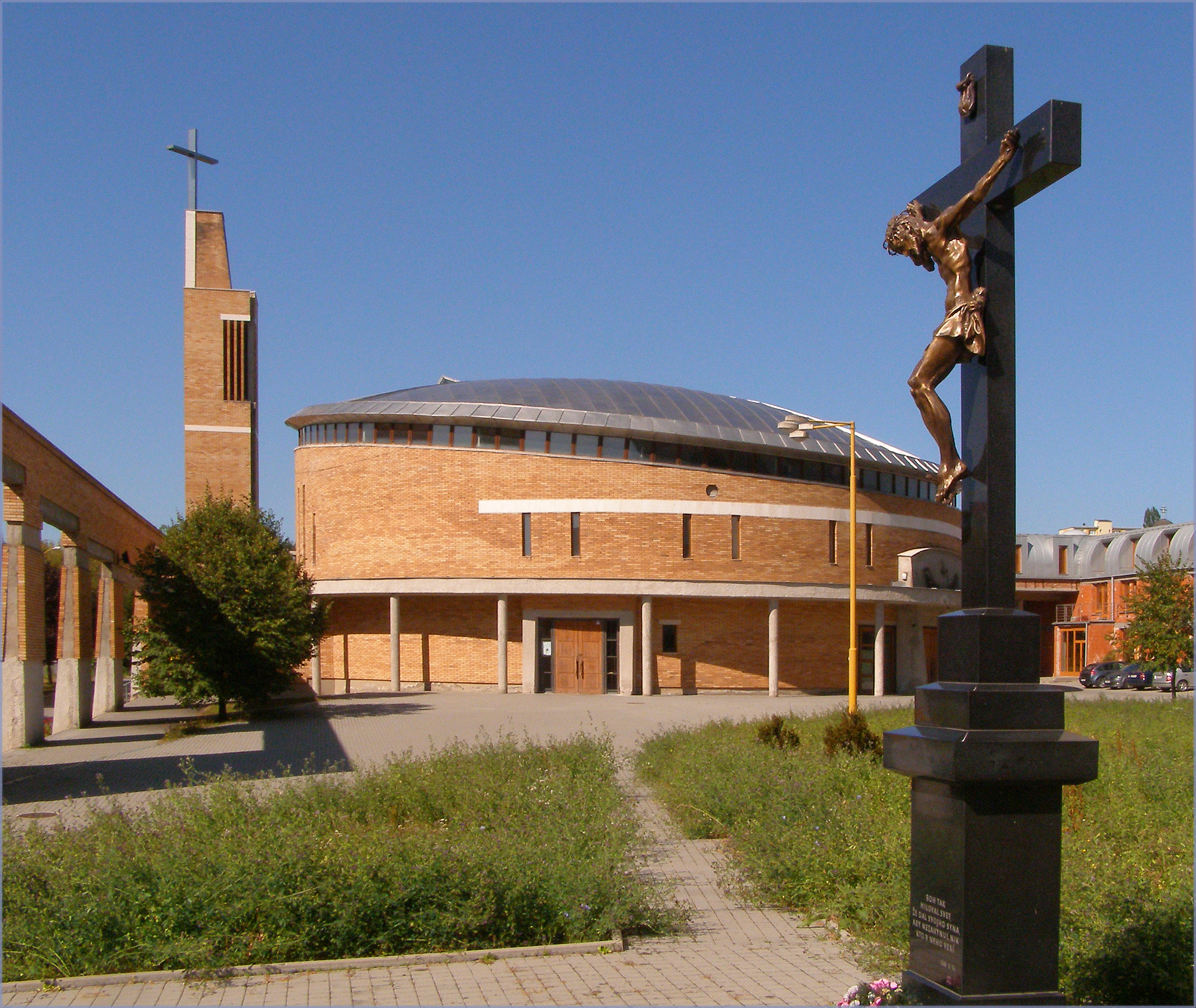
Large church in the borough

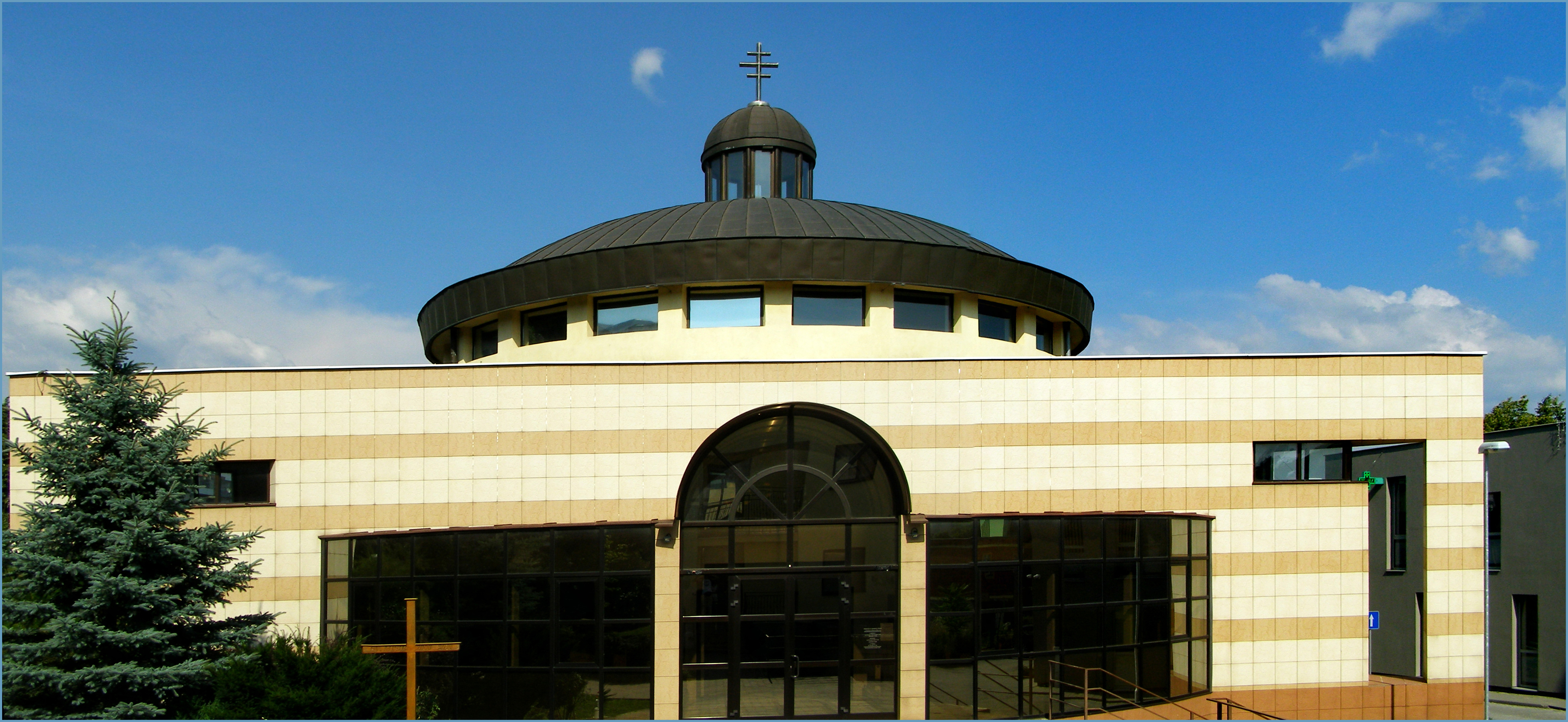
Church of St Peter and St Paul in the borough

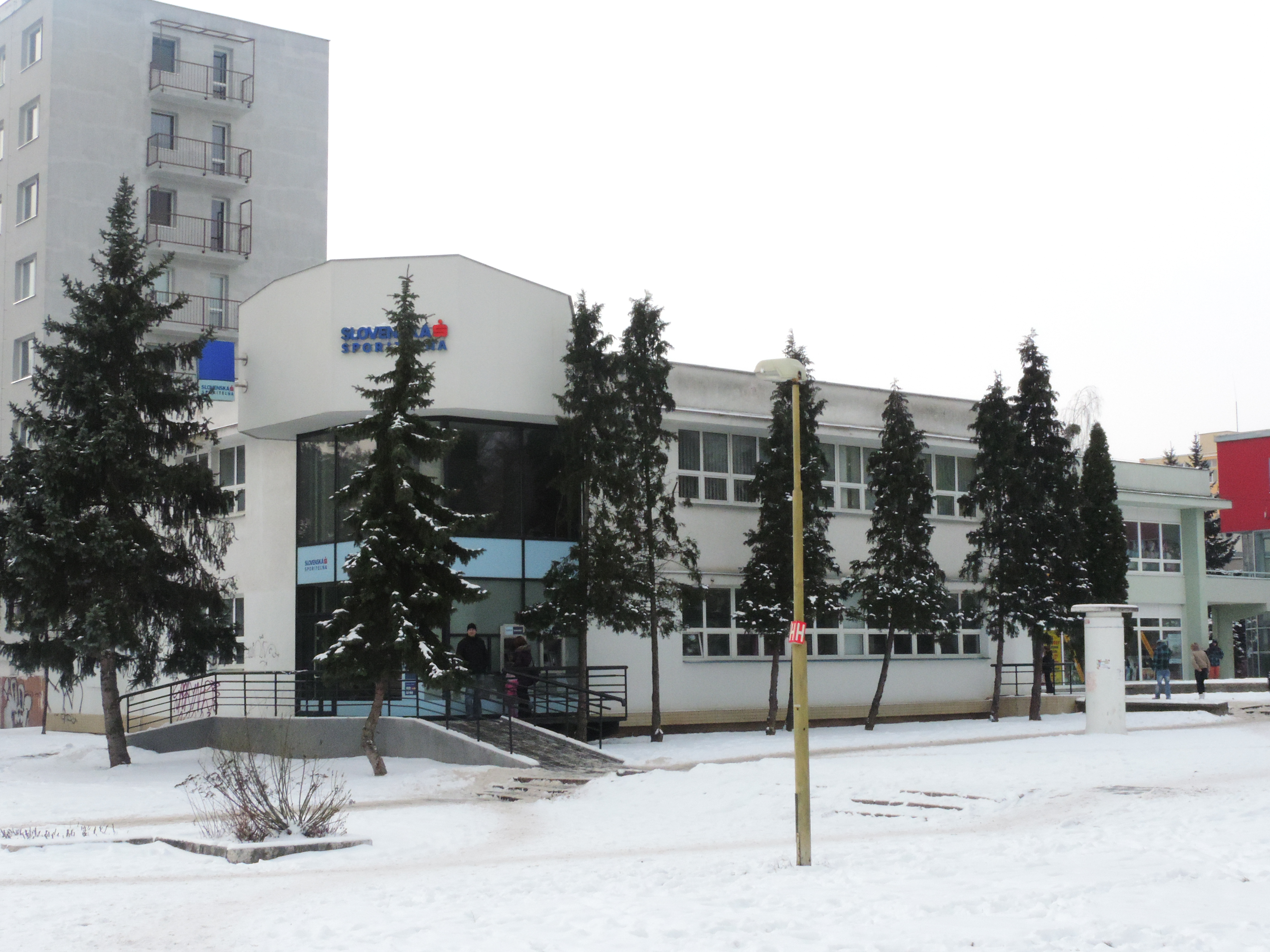
Slovak Savings bank building at one of the borough's housing estates
