= Košice II =

Coordinates: 48.711°N 21.207°E

Košice II District
- District
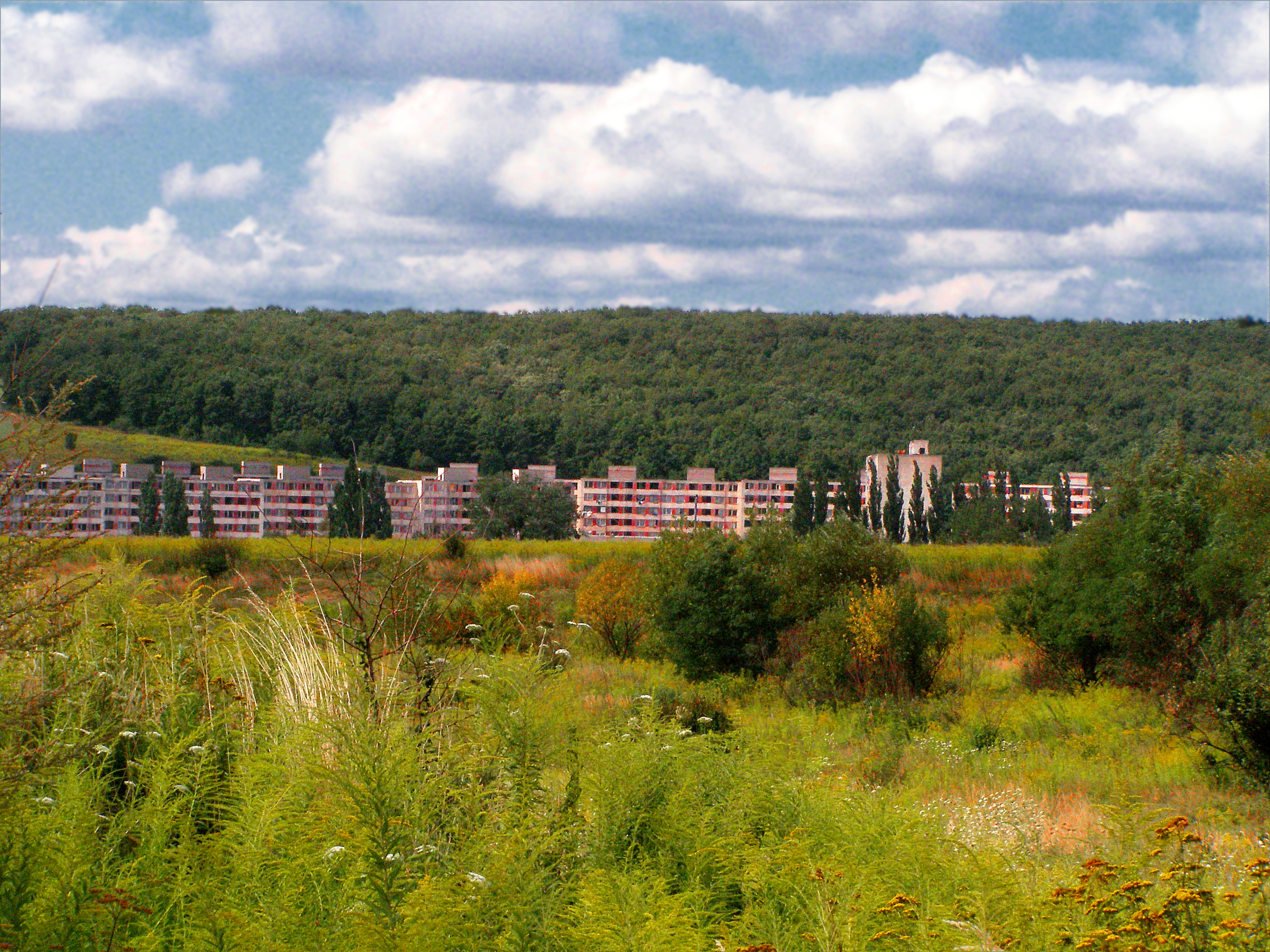
- Country: Slovakia
- Region (kraj): Košice Region
- Seat: Košice

Area
  - Total: 80.54 km^{2} (31.10 sq mi)

Population (2025)
  - Total: 77,569
- Time zone: UTC+1 (CET)
  - Summer (DST): UTC+2 (CEST)
- Telephone prefix: 055
- Vehicle registration plate (until 2022): KE, KC, KI
- Boroughs: 8

Košice II (Hungarian: Kassai II. járás) is a district in the Košice Region of eastern Slovakia, in the city of Košice. It is bordered by the Košice I, Košice IV and Košice-okolie districts. Until 1920, the district was part of the Hungarian county of Abaúj-Torna.

== Population ==
Population statistic (10 years)
Year	1995	2005	2015	2025
Count	82,356	80,256	82,417	77,569
Difference		−2.54%	+2.69%	−5.88%

Population statistic
Year	2024	2025
Count	77,914	77,569
Difference		−0.44%

It has a population of 77,569 people (31 December 2025).

=== Ethnicity ===
Census 2021 (1+ %)
Ethnicity	Number	Fraction
Slovak	65,126	77.36%
Not found out	8773	10.42%
Romani	3954	4.69%
Hungarian	2349	2.79%
Rusyn	1459	1.73%
Czech	901	1.07%
Total	84,175	

In year 2021 was 84,175 people by ethnicity 65,126 as Slovak, 8773 as Not found out, 3954 as Romani, 2349 as Hungarian, 1459 as Rusyn, 901 as Czech, 396 as Other, 299 as Ukrainian, 284 as Vietnamese, 151 as German, 109 as Russian, 64 as Polish, 40 as Moravian, 39 as Jewish, 31 as English, 26 as Bulgarian, 25 as Albanian, 23 as Serbian, 19 as Italian, 18 as Romanian, 16 as Greek, 16 as French, 11 as Austrian, 11 as Croatian, 9 as Chinese, 8 as Irish, 8 as Turkish, 6 as Canadian, 3 as Silesian and 1 as Iranian.

Note on population: The difference values of population numbers in the table "Population statistic" and in the sections "Ethnicity" & "Religion" is caused by the use of various statistical methods.

=== Religion ===
Census 2021 (1+ %)
Religion	Number	Fraction
Roman Catholic Church	34,817	43.83%
None	21,766	27.4%
Not found out	10,666	13.43%
Greek Catholic Church	5163	6.5%
Evangelical Church	2404	3.03%
Calvinist Church	1457	1.83%
Eastern Orthodox Church	1024	1.29%
Total	79,437	

In year 2021 was 79,437 people by religion 34,817 from Roman Catholic Church, 21,766 from None, 10,666 from Not found out, 5163 from Greek Catholic Church, 2404 from Evangelical Church, 1457 from Calvinist Church, 1024 from Eastern Orthodox Church, 352 from Apostolic Church, 272 from Jehovah's Witnesses, 250 from Other, 236 from Ad hoc movements, 203 from Christian Congregations in Slovakia, 160 from Other and not ascertained christian church, 123 from Buddhism, 109 from Baptists Church, 79 from Seventh-day Adventist Church, 74 from Islam, 61 from Church of the Brethren, 60 from Paganism and natural spirituality, 53 from Jewish community, 40 from United Methodist Church, 26 from Hinduism, 16 from Old Catholic Church, 11 from Czechoslovak Hussite Church, 7 from Church of Jesus Christ of Latter-day Saints, 7 from Bahá'i Community and 1 from New Apostolic Church.

== Boroughs ==
Borough	Area [km^{2}]	Population
Lorinčík	2.98	1,290
Luník IX	1.06	7,236
Myslava	6.99	2,687
Pereš	1.35	2,226
Poľov	12.20	1,196
Sídlisko KVP	1.80	21,356
Šaca	47.98	5,679
Západ	5.70	35,899

Population and area values are current for year 2025.
