= Nippon Steel Slovakia =

Steelworks in Košice, Slovakia

- Logo used since 2026

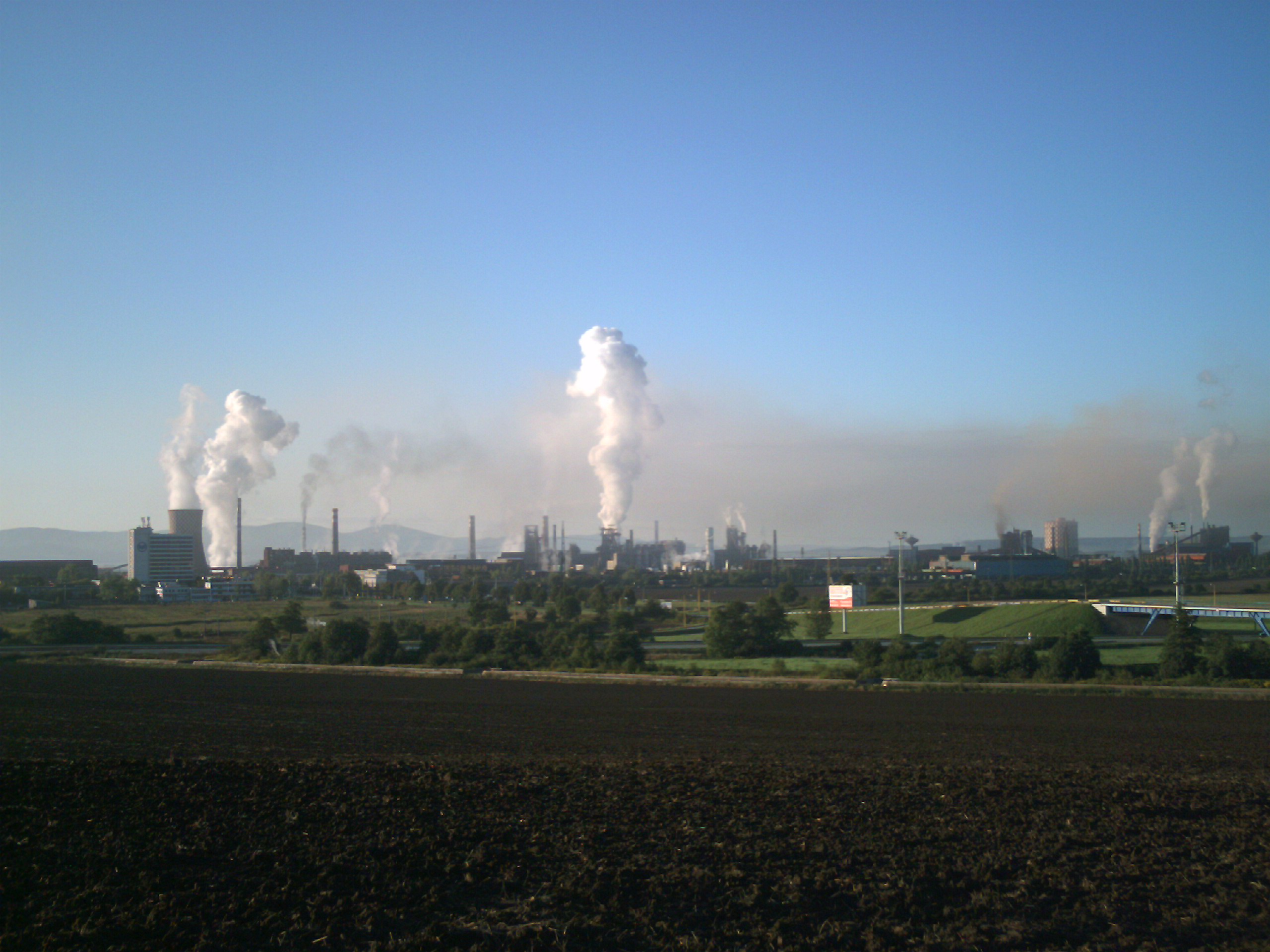
- Factory in Košice
- Formerly: U. S. Steel Košice (2000–2026); VSŽ (1959–2000)
- Type: Public
- Industry: Steel
- Predecessors: U. S. Steel Košice; STEEL Košice; VSŽ OCEĽ
- Founded: November 1, 2000; 25 years ago (as U. S. Steel) April 1, 1959; 67 years ago (as VSŽ)
- Headquarters: Šaca, Košice, Slovakia
- Key people: Katsuhiro Miyamoto (chairman & CEO)
- Revenue: 2,017,271,000 (2016)
- Operating income: 344,172,000 (2016)
- Net income: 270,514,000 (2016)
- Total assets: 1,774,221,000 (2016)
- Number of employees: 7,573 (2025)
- Parent: Nippon Steel
- Subsidiaries: NSSK Security s. r. o. Tubular s.r.o.
- Website: www.sk.nipponsteel.com

Nippon Steel Slovakia, s. r. o. is a steel company located in Šaca, Košice, Slovakia.

The company is descended from the former communist-era company Východoslovenské železiarne (VSŽ) Košice (East Slovak Ironworks, Košice), founded in 1959 and privatized in 2000 when U.S. Steel bought the company.

Following the acquisition of the parent company U. S. Steel by the Japanese company Nippon Steel in 2023, it was announced in May 2026 that Nippon Steel Corporation had decided to transfer U. S. Steel Košice into its direct ownership. The change took effect on October 1, 2026, and also brought a change in the company’s name to NIPPON STEEL SLOVAKIA s. r. o. (abbreviated as NSSK).

== See also ==
- Uzhhorod - Košice broad gauge track
