= Šaca =

- Borough
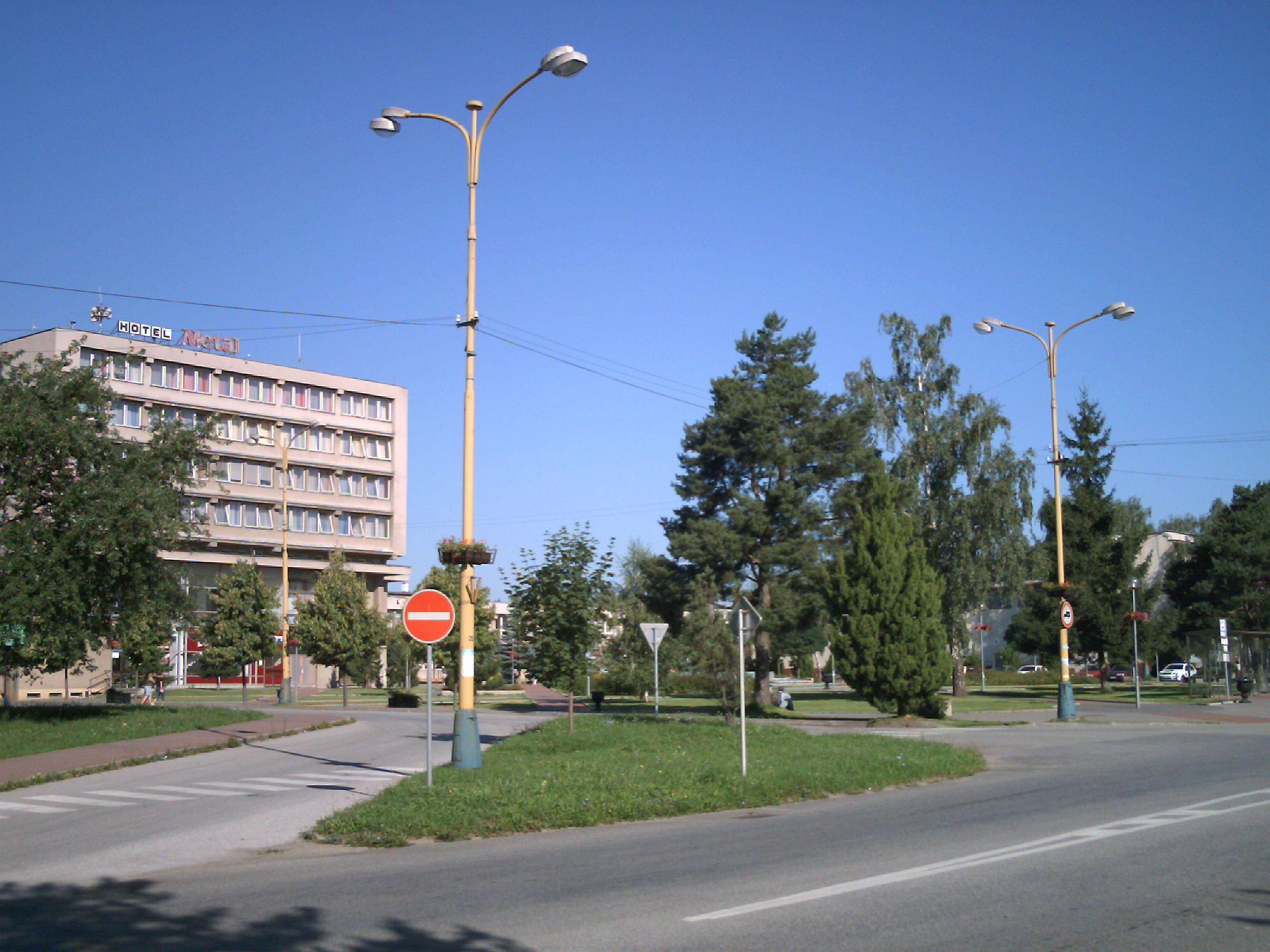
- Central square in Šaca

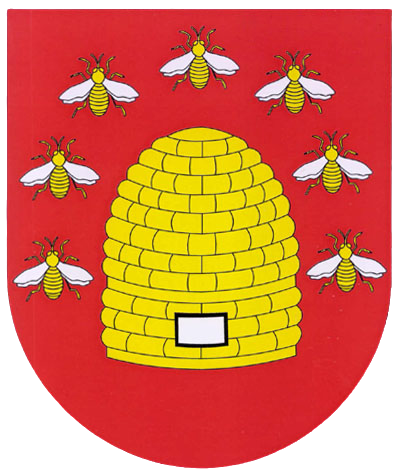
- Flag Coat of arms

- Location within Košice

- Location of Šaca in Slovakia
- Coordinates: 48°37′58″N 21°10′19″E
- Country: Slovakia
- Region: Košice
- District: Košice II
- Village: 1275 (first written record)
- Borough: 1970s (first written record)

Area
  - Total: 47.98 km^{2} (18.53 sq mi)
- Elevation: 244 m (801 ft)

Population (2025)
  - Total: 5,679
- Time zone: UTC+1 (CET)
  - Summer (DST): UTC+2 (CEST)
- Postal code: 040 15
- Area code: +421-55
- Vehicle registration plate (until 2022): KE
- Website: www.saca.sk

Šaca (Hungarian: Saca) is a borough (city ward) of Košice, Slovakia. Located in the Košice II district, at an altitude of roughly 244 metres (801 ft) above sea level, it is home to several important hospitals and medical facilities, as well as Košice's steel works and other heavy industry. One of Šaca's localities is Bužinka, which includes some of the borough's older historical architecture.

== History ==
The first written record about Šaca dates back to 1275. Since 1427 the landowners of Šaca were the Semsey family, who built a castle here in the 15th century. It was demolished later in the same century, on the order of the King Matthias Corvinus. Later members of the family built a rococo manor house in Šaca in the late 18th century, which stands to this day. Water mills were operated in Šaca since the Middle Ages, until 1950.

After World War II, the village became a residential district for builders of a new steelworks company - Východoslovenské železiarne Košice (VSŽ Košice - "East Slovak Ironworks, Košice"). In January 1960 construction started on more than 8 square kilometres of land. In 1965 the first blast furnace was fired up and production in the hot rolling mill and coke plant was started. In four decades the Košice mill has developed into a steel-producing plant that has managed to reach the markets and achieve a position among the significant steel producers. It has been accepted as a member of prestigious international organizations associating iron and steel producers and has become a partner of renowned foreign firms in joint ventures. The new phase in the history of the factory started on November 24, 2000 when the metallurgy production and commercial activities were sold to the United States Steel Corporation and VSŽ Košice changed its name to U. S. Steel Košice.

In the 1970s, Šaca gained an urban character and became one of 22 boroughs of Košice.

=== Evolution of the borough's name ===
Some of the historical names of Šaca.

- 1275 - Latin: Ida
- 1280 - terra Eghazas Ida
- 1319 - poss. Saticha
- 1328 - poss. Zethyce alio nomine Scenthtrinitas
- 1344 - Setyche
- 1372 - poss. Setyche
- 1379 - poss. Sathicha, poss. Satycha
- 1385 - Sathicha, poss. Sathycha alio nomine Screben
- 1393 - Sathicha, Sagcza al. Nom. Zenthtrinitas
- 1395 - poss. Seu villa Senthythe
- 1409 - poss. Sethithe, poss. Sethyche
- 1424 - villa Saczcza
- 1427 - poss. Sechcha, Secha
- 1428 - poss. Sathcza
- 1469 - poss. Sacza
- 1471 - poss. Saccza
- 1474 - poss. Saczcza
- 1477 - poss. Saczcza
- 1514 - Saccza
- 1553 - Sacha
- 1773 - Hungarian: Szácza
- 1786 - Sacza
- 1808 - Slovak: Ssáca, Hungarian: Sácza
- 1863 - Saca
- 1903 - sk: Šaca, hu: Sacza
- 1906, 1938 - sk: Šaca, hu: Saca

=== Historical landmarks ===
A 1770s Roman Catholic church in the Bužinka locality.

A rococo manor house of the Semsey family, built in the 1770s (in preserved condition), and a smaller manor house in the Bužinka locality (currently ruined).

== Statistics ==
- Area: 41.2 square kilometres (15.9 sq mi)
- Population: 5,890 (31 December 2017)
- Density of population: 140/km^{2} (31 December 2017)
- District: Košice II
- Mayor: Daniel Petrík (as of 2018 elections)

== Geography ==
The municipality lies at an altitude of 244 metres (801 ft) and covers an area of 47.98 km^{2} (18.53 sq mi) (2025).

== Population ==
Population statistic (10 years)
Year	1995	2005	2015	2025
Count	0	5096	5728	5679
Difference		–	+12.40%	−0.85%

Population statistic
Year	2024	2025
Count	5706	5679
Difference		−0.47%

It has a population of 5679 people (31 December 2025).

=== Ethnicity ===
Census 2021 (1+ %)
Ethnicity	Number	Fraction
Slovak	4747	82.96%
Not found out	831	14.52%
Romani	292	5.1%
Hungarian	98	1.71%
Rusyn	82	1.43%
Total	5722	

In year 2021 was 5722 people by ethnicity 4747 as Slovak, 831 as Not found out, 292 as Romani, 98 as Hungarian, 82 as Rusyn, 25 as Ukrainian, 23 as Czech, 18 as Other, 5 as Vietnamese, 2 as German, 1 as Jewish, 1 as Russian, 1 as Romanian, 1 as Polish, 1 as Moravian, 1 as Canadian, 1 as French, 1 as Bulgarian and 1 as English.

Note on population: The difference values of population numbers in the table "Population statistic" and in the sections "Ethnicity" & "Religion" is caused by the use of various statistical methods.

=== Religion ===
Census 2021 (1+ %)
Religion	Number	Fraction
Roman Catholic Church	3320	58.02%
None	907	15.85%
Not found out	795	13.89%
Greek Catholic Church	276	4.82%
Calvinist Church	121	2.11%
Evangelical Church	112	1.96%
Eastern Orthodox Church	68	1.19%
Total	5722	

In year 2021 was 5722 people by religion 3320 from Roman Catholic Church, 907 from None, 795 from Not found out, 276 from Greek Catholic Church, 121 from Calvinist Church, 112 from Evangelical Church, 68 from Eastern Orthodox Church, 30 from Jehovah's Witnesses, 24 from Christian Congregations in Slovakia, 16 from Other, 12 from Ad hoc movements, 11 from Buddhism, 6 from Other and not ascertained christian church, 6 from Apostolic Church, 5 from Church of the Brethren, 4 from Islam, 2 from United Methodist Church, 2 from Czechoslovak Hussite Church, 1 from Old Catholic Church, 1 from Paganism and natural spirituality, 1 from Hinduism, 1 from Seventh-day Adventist Church and 1 from Baptists Church.

== Sports and recreation ==
There are several sports facilities in the Šaca borough, including a football (soccer) stadium.

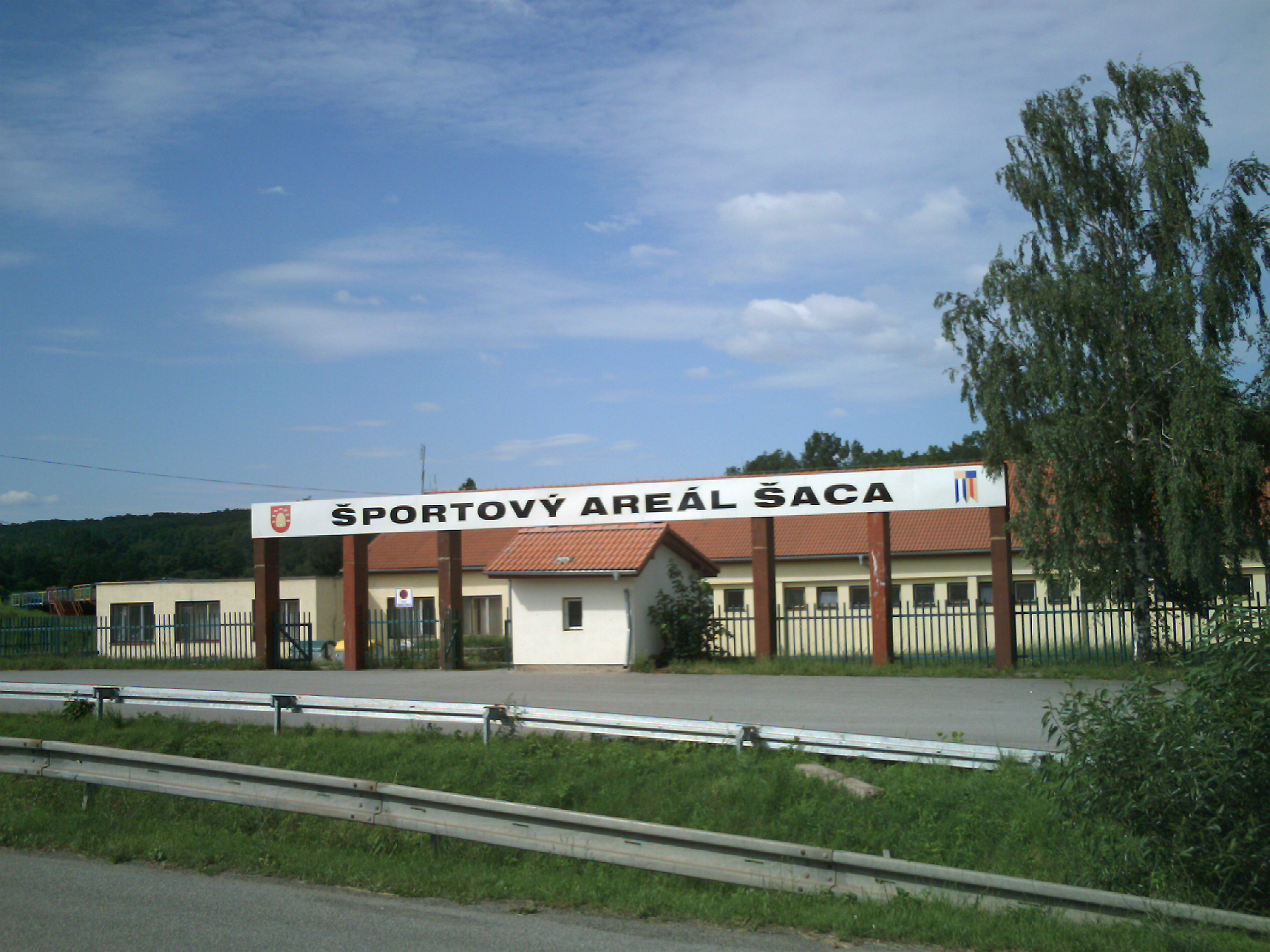
Soccer stadium at the sports area in Šaca

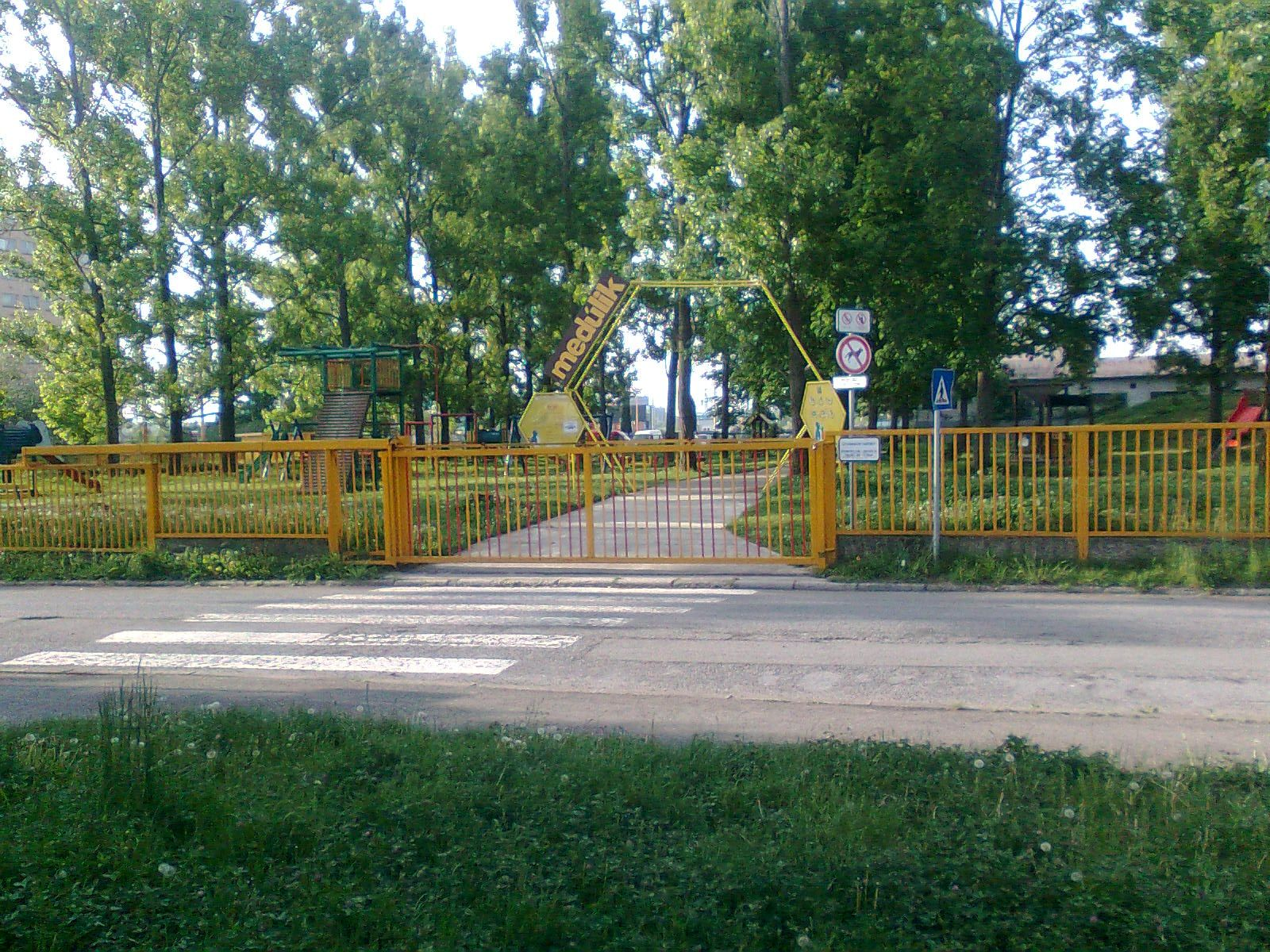
Park with playground in Šaca

== Gallery ==
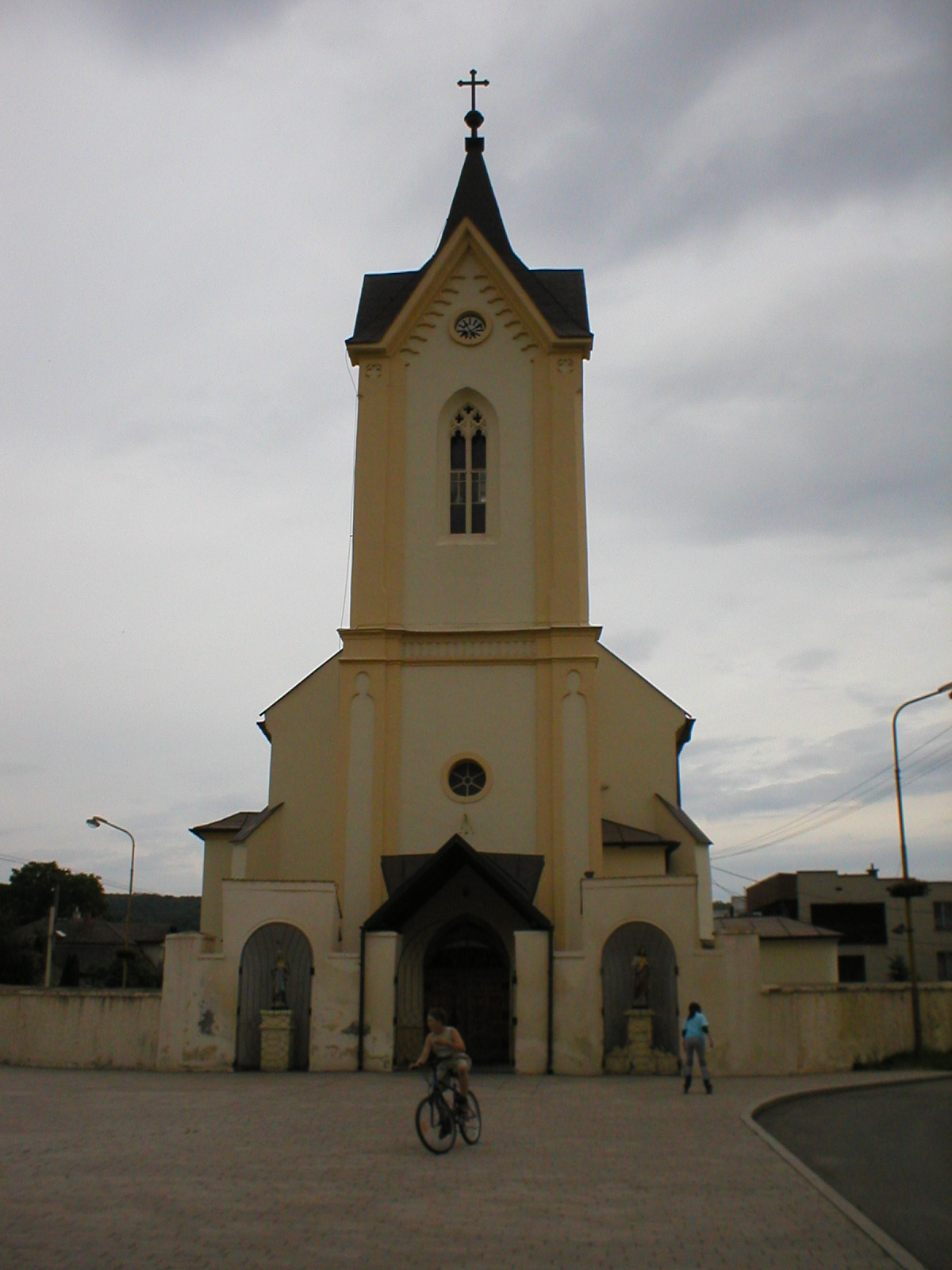
The Assumption of the Virgin Mary Church, a Roman Catholic parish church, initially The Holy Trinity Church (erected in 1779)

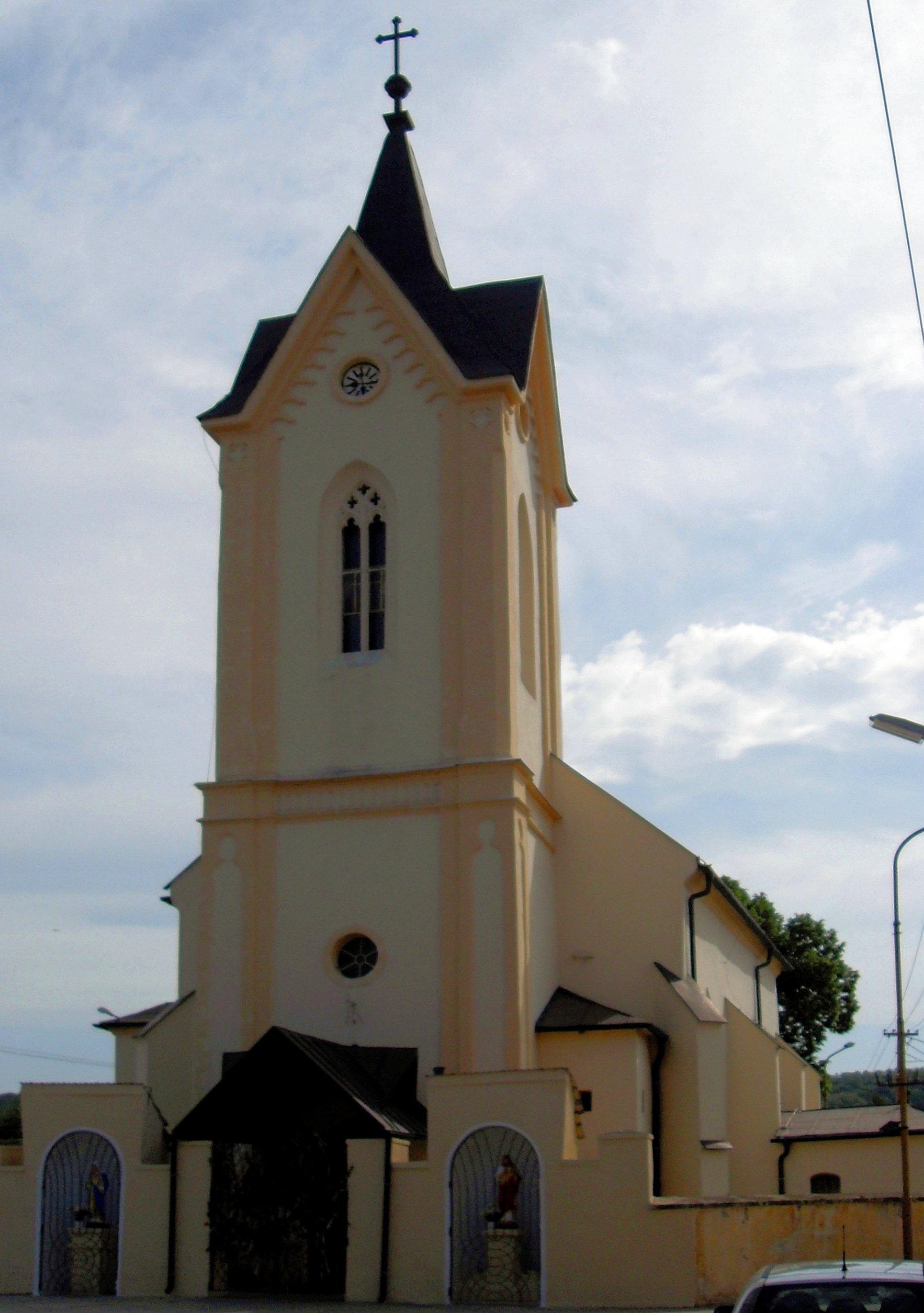
The Assumption of the Virgin Mary Church, a Roman Catholic parish church, initially The Holy Trinity Church (erected in 1779)

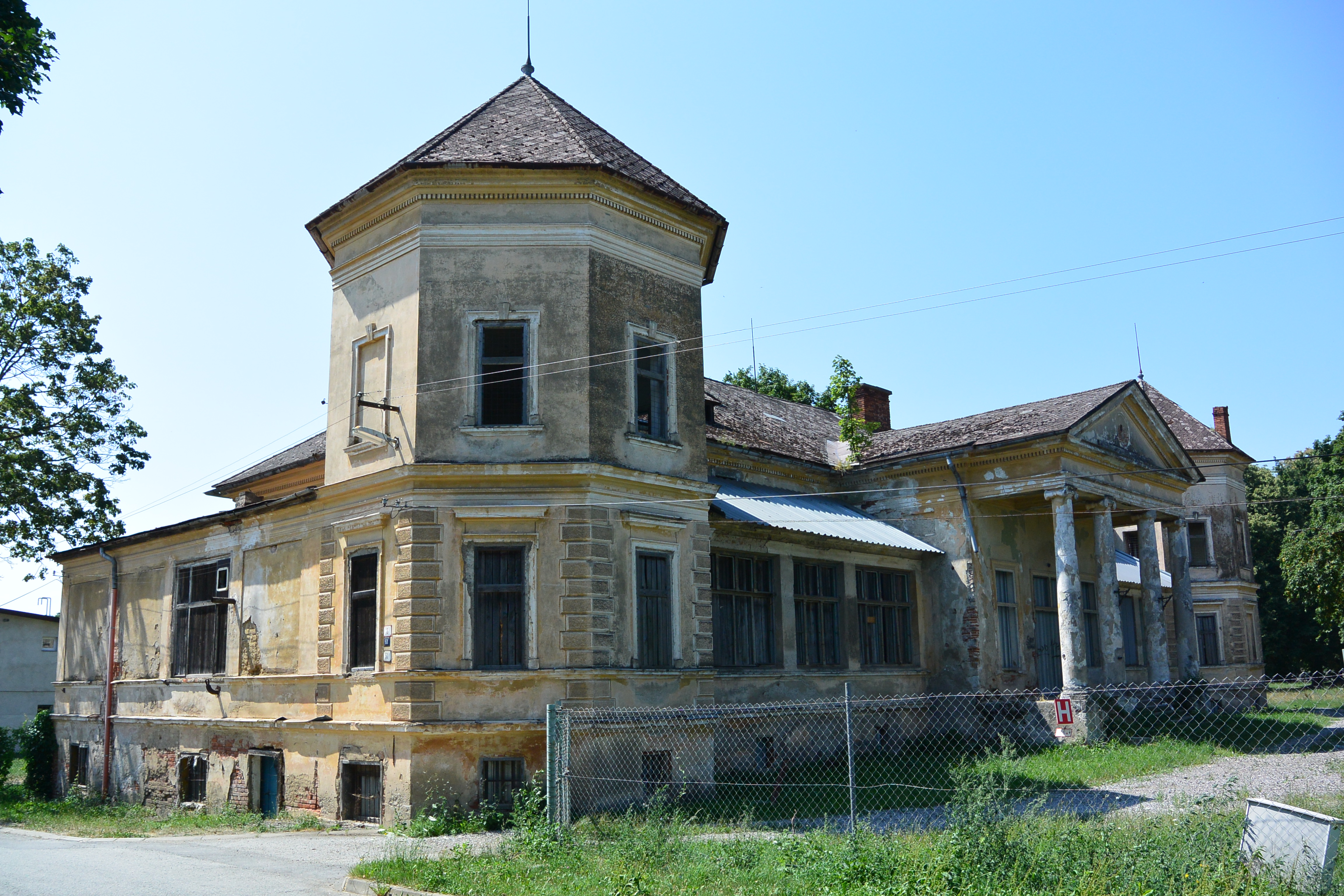
Old manor house in Šaca's Bužinka locality

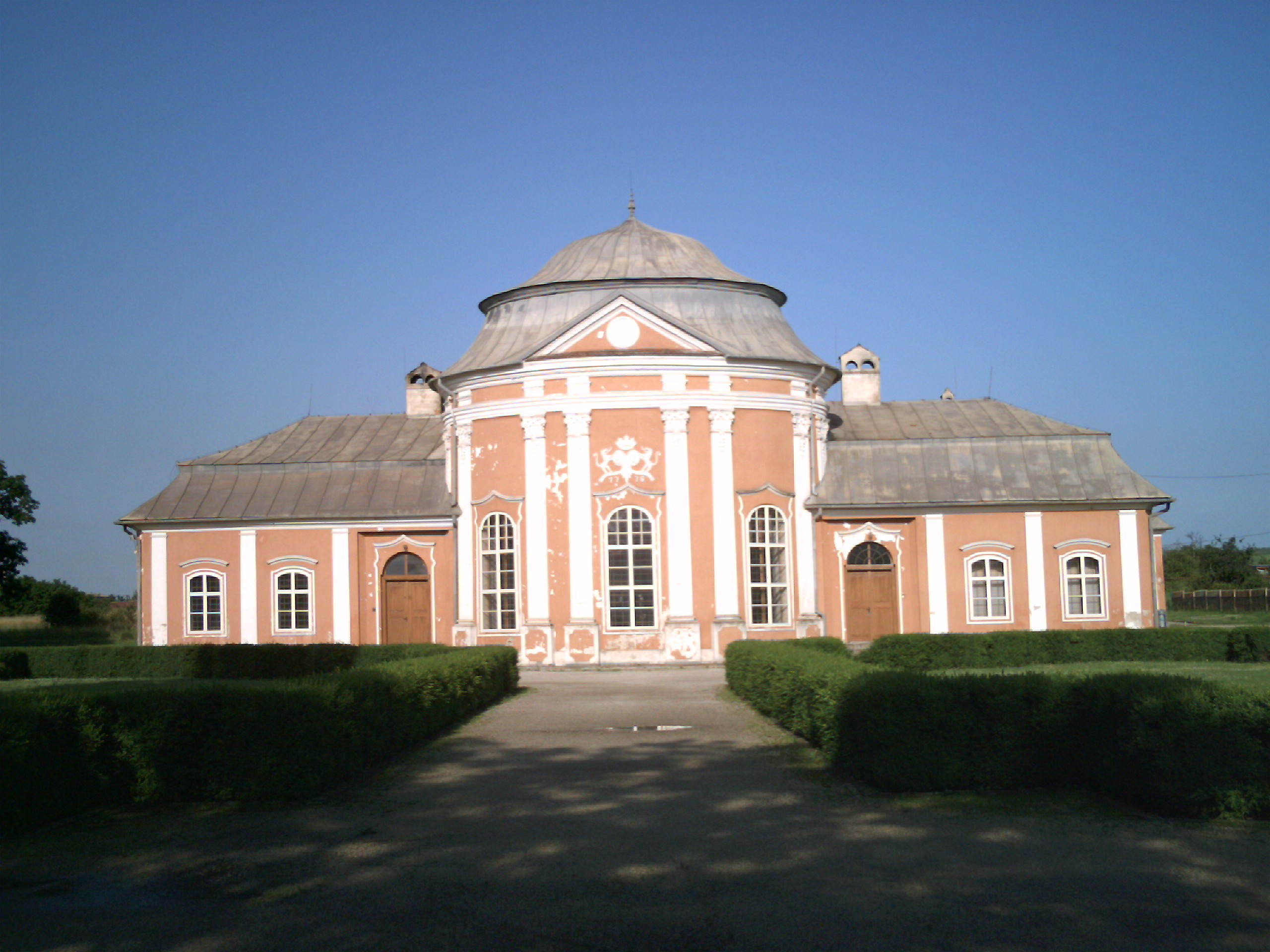
Rococo manor house of the Semsey family in Šaca (erected in 1776)

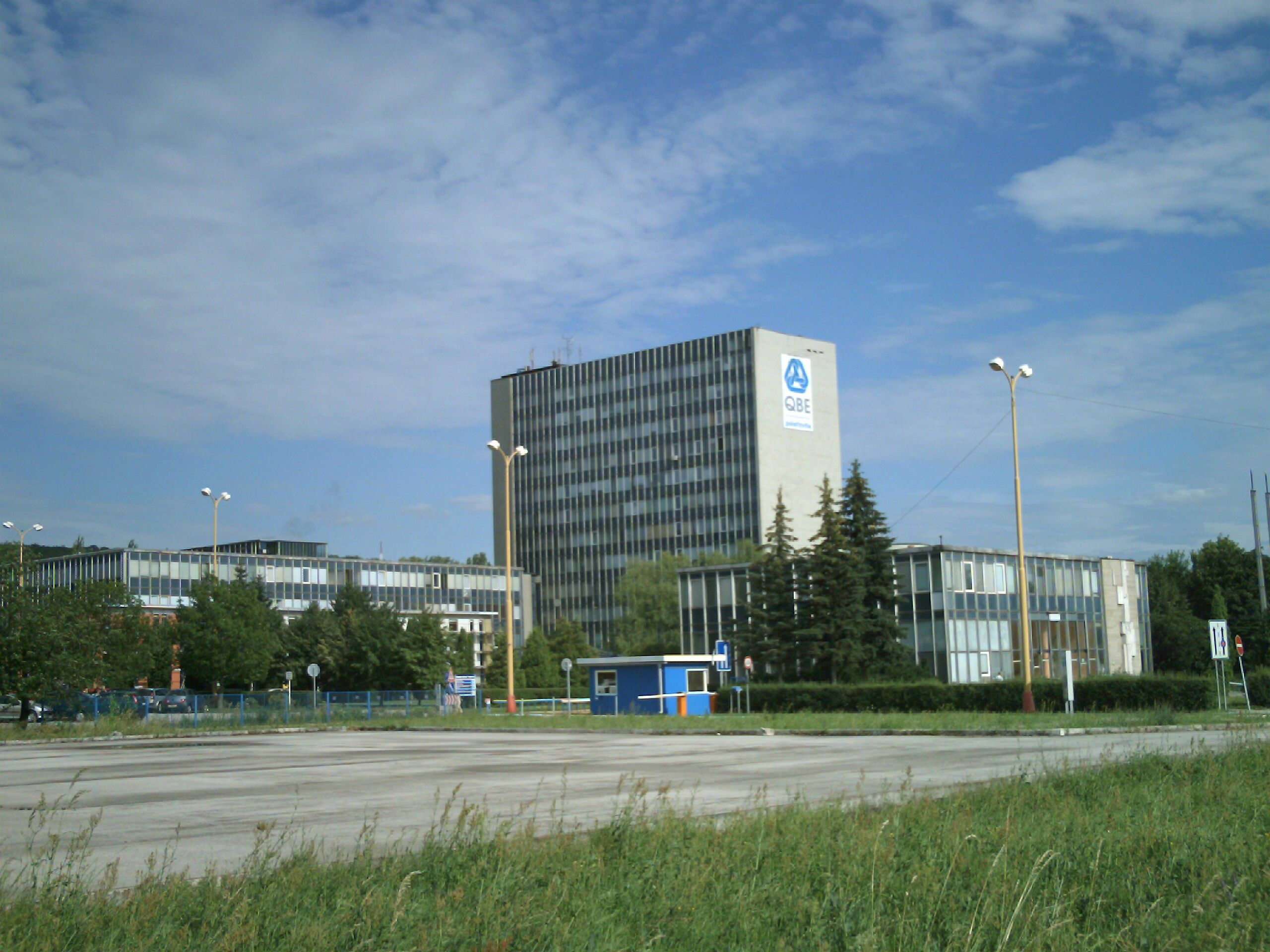
Hospital in Šaca

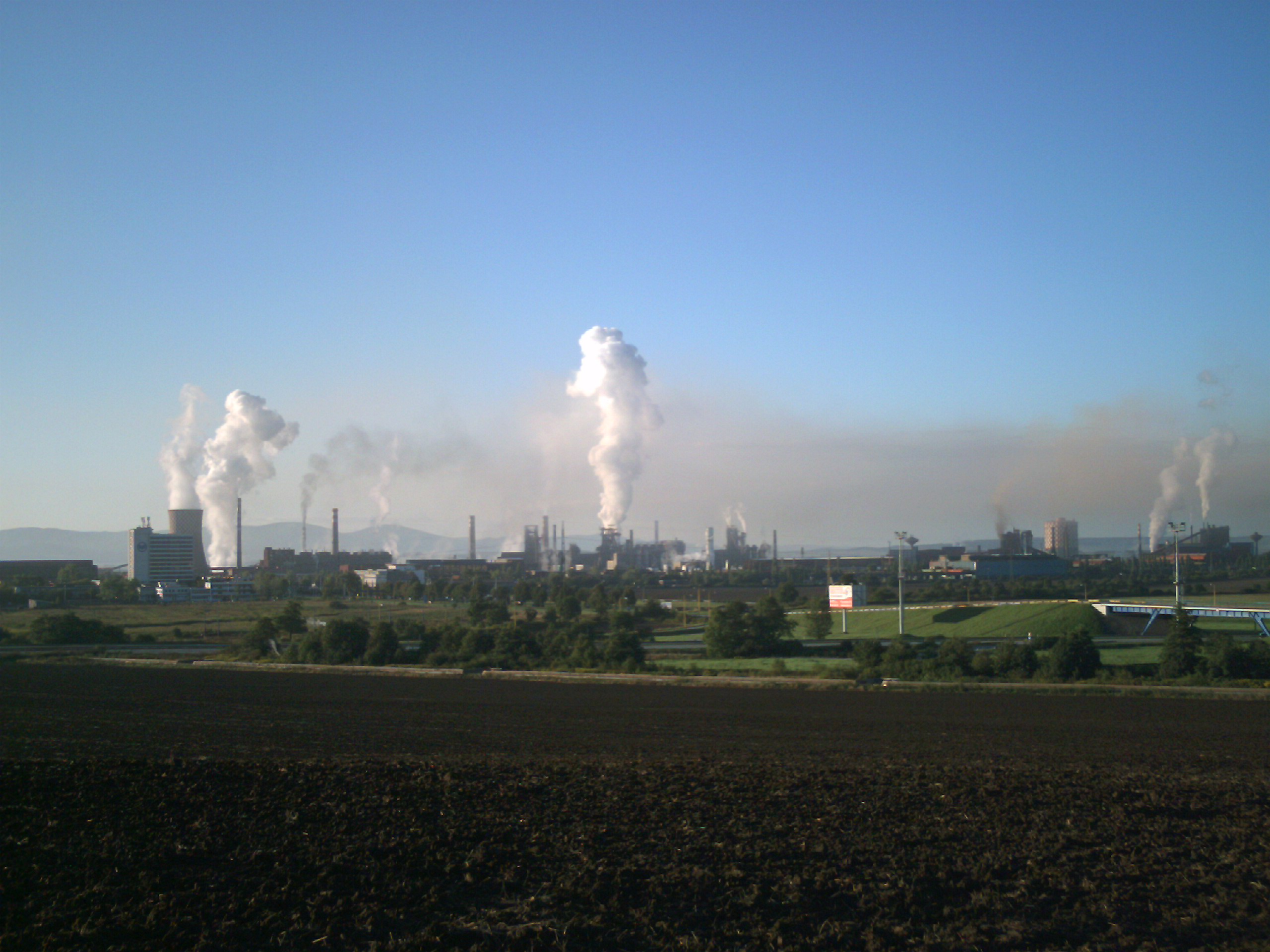
U. S. Steel Košice, s.r.o.
