= Myslava =

Coordinates: 48°43′N 21°12′E

- Borough
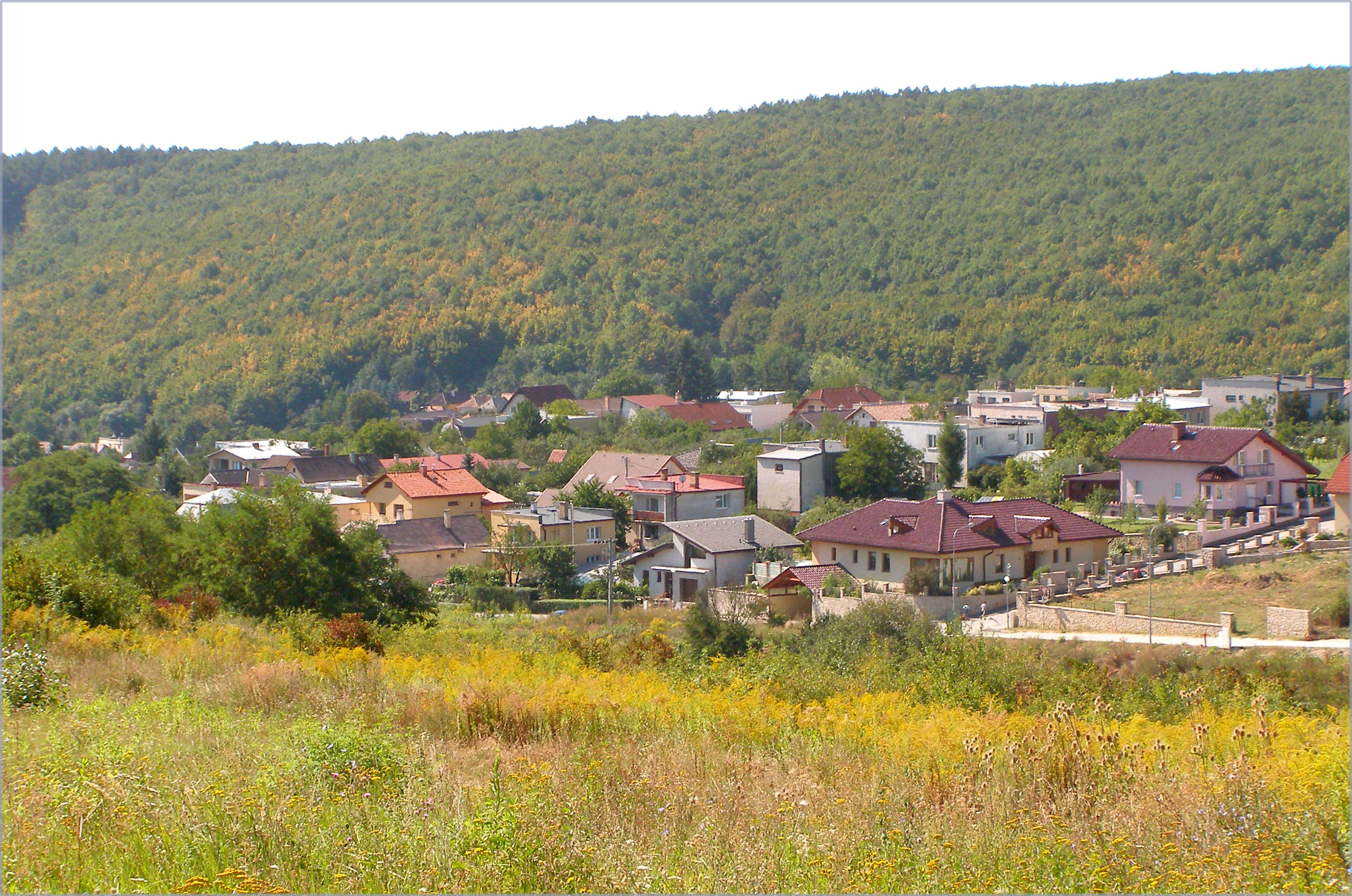
- Panorama of Myslava (August 2012)

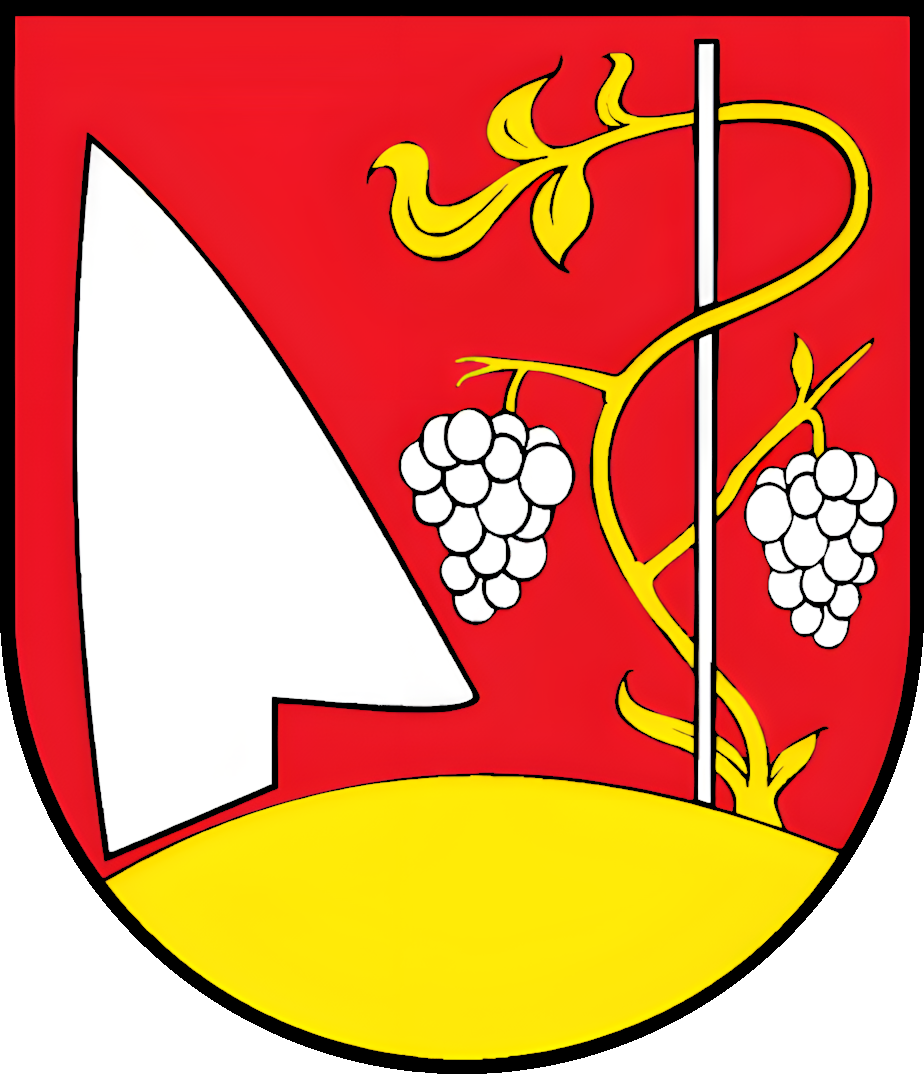
- Flag Coat of arms

- Location within Košice

- Location of Myslava in Slovakia
- Country: Slovakia
- Region: Košice
- District: Košice II
- Village: 1382 (first known record)

Area
  - Total: 6.99 km^{2} (2.70 sq mi)
- Elevation: 252 m (827 ft)

Population (2025)
  - Total: 2,687
- Time zone: UTC+1 (CET)
  - Summer (DST): UTC+2 (CEST)
- Postal code: 040 16
- Area code: +421-55
- Vehicle registration plate (until 2022): KE
- Website: www.myslava.eu

Myslava (Hungarian: Miszlóka, German: Deutschendorf) is a borough (city ward) of the city of Košice, Slovakia. Located in the Košice II district, it lies at an altitude of roughly 252 metres (827 ft) above sea level, and is home to over 2,200 people. It retains much of its rural character.

== History ==
The first written record of Myslava dates back to 1382.

It was an independent village municipality until it was connected to Košice.

== Statistics ==
- Area: 7.01 square kilometres (2.71 sq mi)
- Population: 2,257 (December 2017)
- Density of population: 320/km^{2} (December 2017)
- District: Košice II
- Mayor: Iveta Šimková (as of 2018 elections)

== Geography ==
The municipality lies at an altitude of 252 metres (827 ft) and covers an area of 6.99 km^{2} (2.70 sq mi) (2025).

== Population ==
Population statistic (10 years)
Year	1995	2005	2015	2025
Count	0	1836	2120	2687
Difference		–	+15.46%	+26.74%

Population statistic
Year	2024	2025
Count	2681	2687
Difference		+0.22%

It has a population of 2687 people (31 December 2025).

=== Ethnicity ===
Census 2021 (1+ %)
Ethnicity	Number	Fraction
Slovak	2369	93.08%
Not found out	128	5.02%
Czech	31	1.21%
Rusyn	31	1.21%
Hungarian	30	1.17%
Total	2545	

In year 2021 was 2545 people by ethnicity 2369 as Slovak, 128 as Not found out, 31 as Czech, 31 as Rusyn, 30 as Hungarian, 10 as Other, 6 as Romani, 5 as Ukrainian, 5 as Russian, 4 as German, 3 as Vietnamese, 3 as Polish, 2 as Romanian, 1 as Jewish, 1 as Serbian, 1 as Bulgarian, 1 as English and 1 as Albanian.

Note on population: The difference values of population numbers in the table "Population statistic" and in the sections "Ethnicity" & "Religion" is caused by the use of various statistical methods.

=== Religion ===
Census 2021 (1+ %)
Religion	Number	Fraction
Roman Catholic Church	1554	61.06%
None	569	22.36%
Greek Catholic Church	132	5.19%
Not found out	130	5.11%
Evangelical Church	54	2.12%
Eastern Orthodox Church	27	1.06%
Total	2545	

In year 2021 was 2545 people by religion 1554 from Roman Catholic Church, 569 from None, 132 from Greek Catholic Church, 130 from Not found out, 54 from Evangelical Church, 27 from Eastern Orthodox Church, 21 from Calvinist Church, 12 from Baptists Church, 10 from Ad hoc movements, 7 from Jehovah's Witnesses, 7 from Other, 4 from Other and not ascertained christian church, 4 from Christian Congregations in Slovakia, 3 from Seventh-day Adventist Church, 3 from Apostolic Church, 2 from Paganism and natural spirituality, 2 from Islam, 2 from Buddhism, 1 from Jewish community and 1 from Bahá'i Community.

== Gallery ==
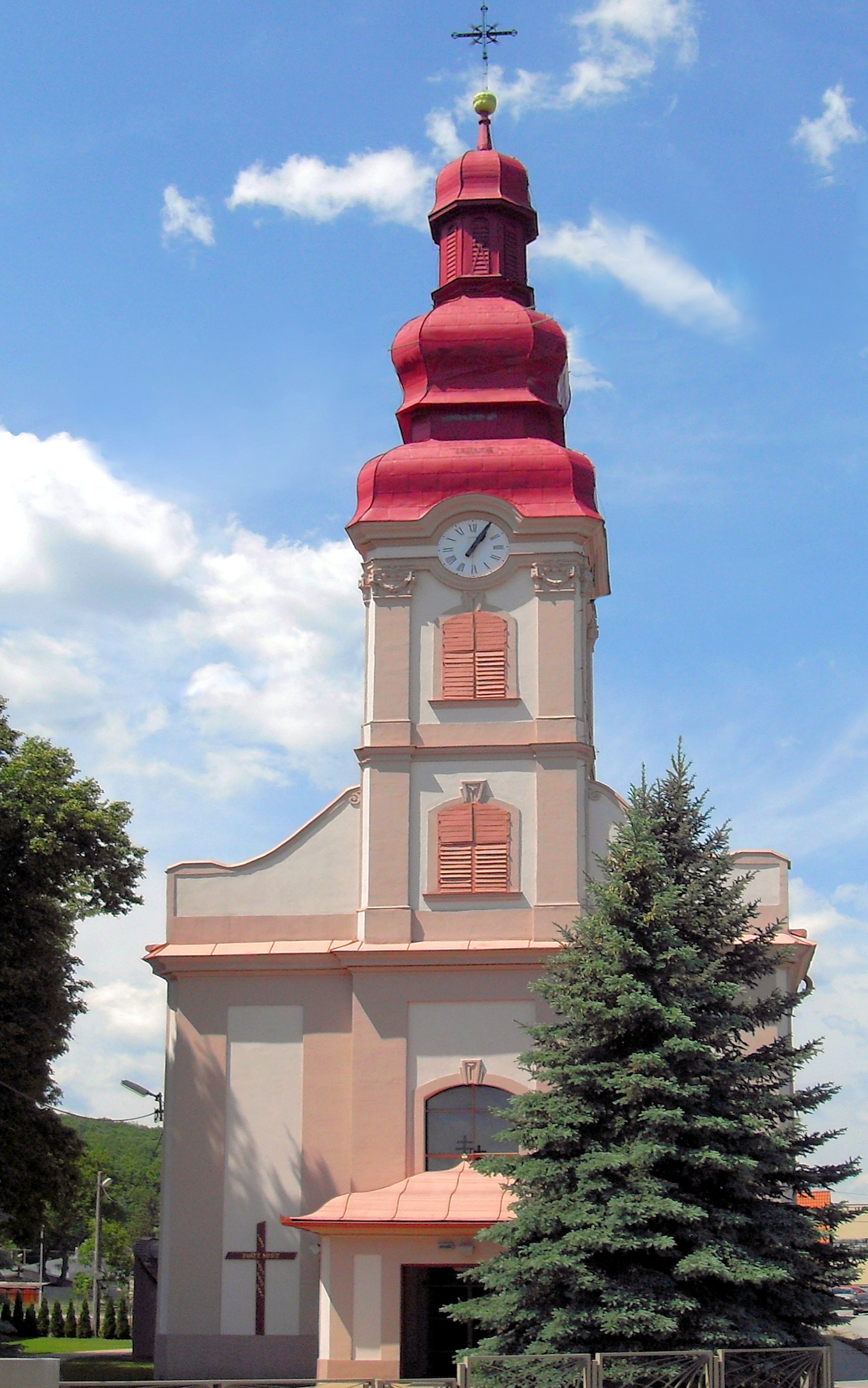
Church of St Bartholomew in the Myslava borough (May 2012)

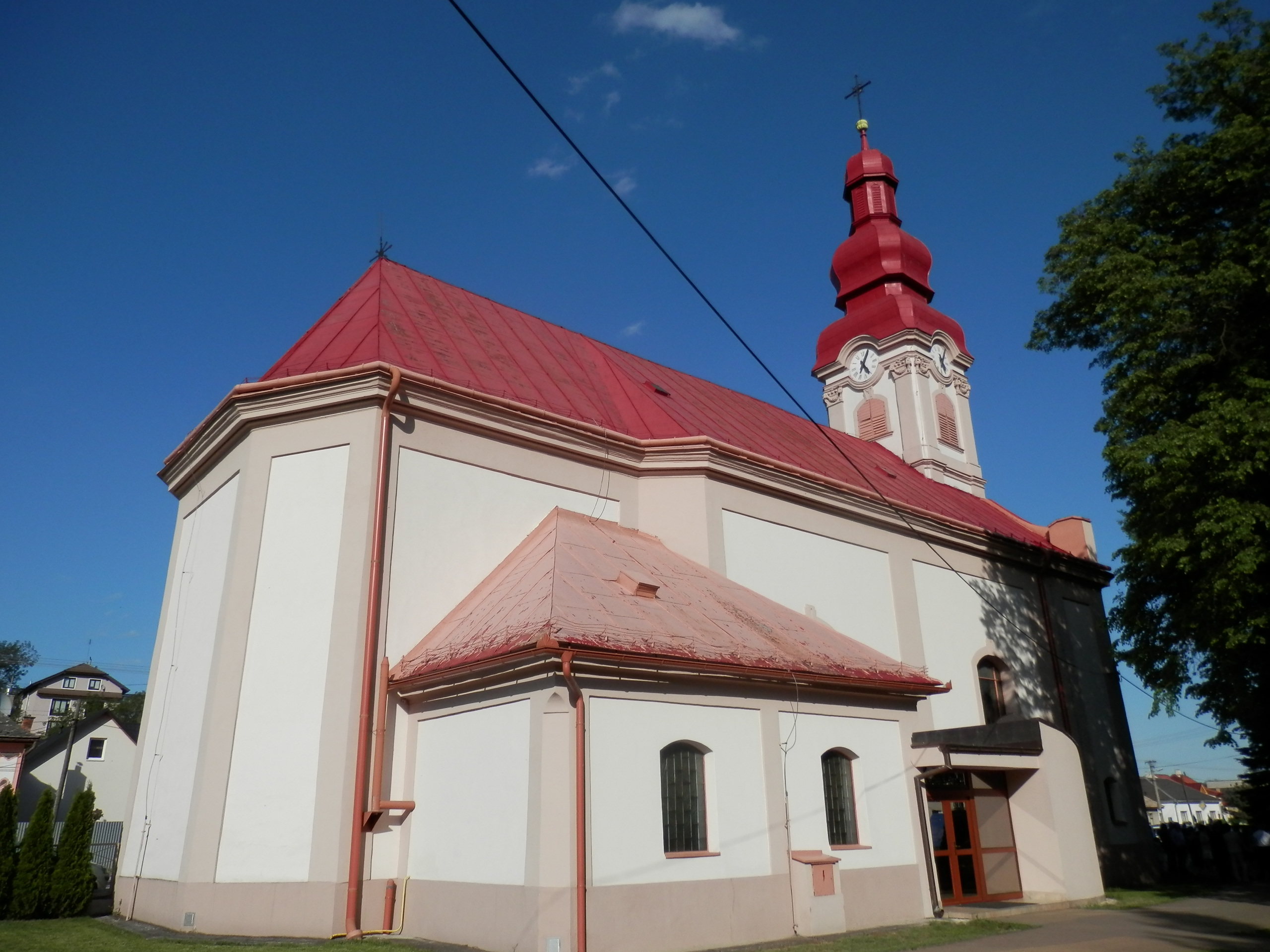
Church of St Bartholomew in the Myslava borough (May 2015)

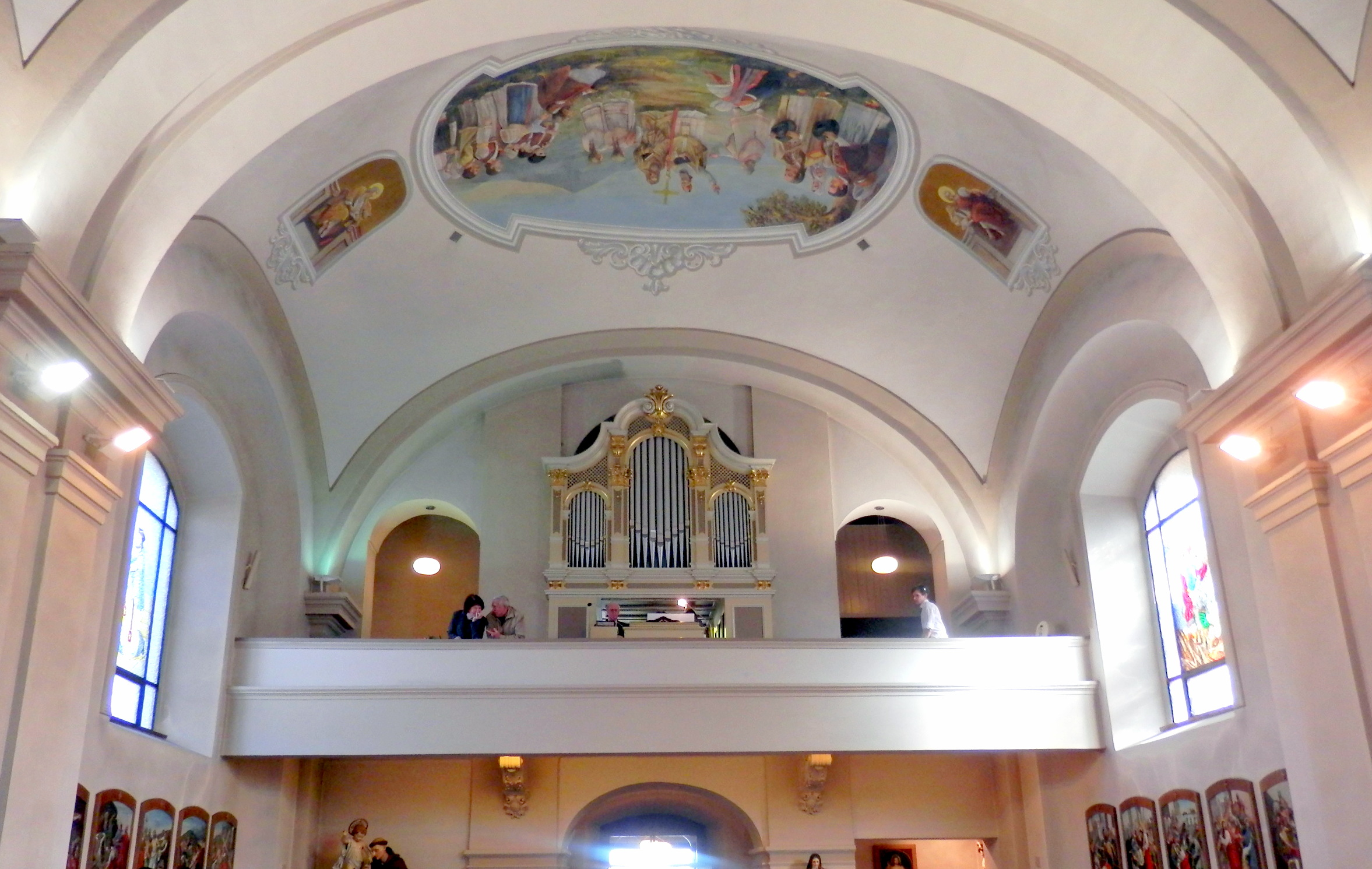
Church of St Bartholomew interior

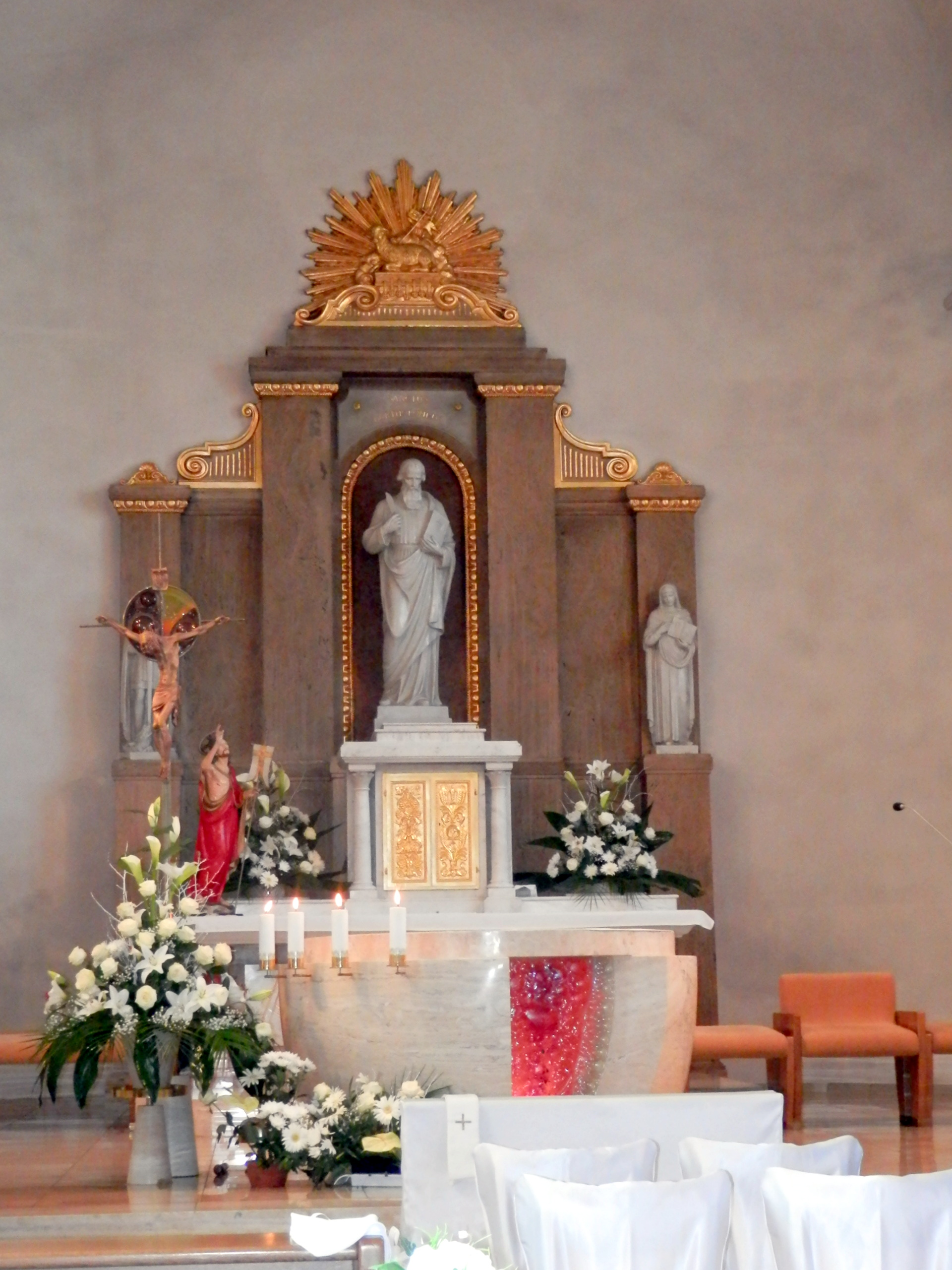
Church of St Bartholomew interior (altar)
