= Sídlisko KVP =

Coordinates: 48.7158°N 21.2322°E

- Borough
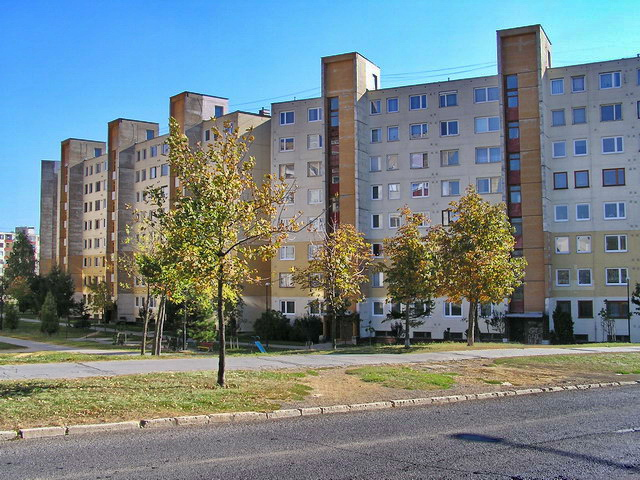
- Housing estate in Sídlisko KVP (2006)

- Flag Coat of arms

- Location within Košice

- Location of Sídlisko KVP in Slovakia
- Country: Slovakia
- Region: Košice
- District: Košice II
- Borough: 1980

Area
  - Total: 1.80 km^{2} (0.69 sq mi)
- Elevation: 309 m (1,014 ft)

Population (2025)
  - Total: 21,356
- Time zone: UTC+1 (CET)
  - Summer (DST): UTC+2 (CEST)
- Postal code: 040 23
- Area code: +421-55
- Vehicle registration plate (until 2022): KE
- Website: www.mckvp.sk

Sídlisko KVP is a borough (city ward) in the city of Košice, Slovakia, in the Košice II district. The borough is located in the Košice II district, at an altitude of roughly 309 metres (1,014 ft) above sea level, and is synonymous with the Sídlisko KVP (KVP Housing Estate) that covers most of its territory.

The name "KVP" stands for "Košický vládny program" ("Košice Government Program").

== History ==
The borough was founded in 1980, along with the new housing estates being built here at the time. Large-scale construction of the borough lasted until 1989.

== Statistics ==
- Area: 1.78 square kilometres (0.69 sq mi)
- Population: 23,864 (December 2017)
- Population density: 13,000/km^{2} (December 2017)
- District: Košice II
- Mayor: Ladislav Lörinc (as of 2018 elections)

== Geography ==
The municipality lies at an altitude of 309 metres (1,014 ft) and covers an area of 1.80 km^{2} (0.69 sq mi) (2025).

== Population ==
Population statistic (10 years)
Year	1995	2005	2015	2025
Count	0	25,431	24,314	21,356
Difference		–	−4.39%	−12.16%

Population statistic
Year	2024	2025
Count	21,471	21,356
Difference		−0.53%

It has a population of 21,356 people (31 December 2025).

=== Ethnicity ===
Census 2021 (1+ %)
Ethnicity	Number	Fraction
Slovak	19,720	88.66%
Not found out	1560	7.01%
Hungarian	754	3.39%
Rusyn	439	1.97%
Vietnamese	225	1.01%
Total	22,241	

In year 2021 was 22,241 people by ethnicity 19,720 as Slovak, 1560 as Not found out, 754 as Hungarian, 439 as Rusyn, 225 as Vietnamese, 212 as Czech, 112 as Other, 89 as Ukrainian, 46 as Romani, 37 as German, 35 as Russian, 16 as Polish, 9 as Italian, 9 as Serbian, 8 as Moravian, 8 as English, 5 as Jewish, 5 as Irish, 5 as Greek, 4 as Bulgarian, 3 as Turkish, 3 as Austrian, 3 as French, 3 as Croatian, 3 as Albanian, 2 as Canadian, 1 as Silesian and 1 as Romanian.

Note on population: The difference values of population numbers in the table "Population statistic" and in the sections "Ethnicity" & "Religion" is caused by the use of various statistical methods.

=== Religion ===
Census 2021 (1+ %)
Religion	Number	Fraction
Roman Catholic Church	9997	44.95%
None	6842	30.76%
Not found out	1752	7.88%
Greek Catholic Church	1501	6.75%
Evangelical Church	742	3.34%
Calvinist Church	460	2.07%
Eastern Orthodox Church	323	1.45%
Total	22,241	

In year 2021 was 22,241 people by religion 9997 from Roman Catholic Church, 6842 from None, 1752 from Not found out, 1501 from Greek Catholic Church, 742 from Evangelical Church, 460 from Calvinist Church, 323 from Eastern Orthodox Church, 108 from Apostolic Church, 93 from Jehovah's Witnesses, 85 from Other, 84 from Ad hoc movements, 51 from Buddhism, 36 from Christian Congregations in Slovakia, 32 from Other and not ascertained christian church, 30 from Seventh-day Adventist Church, 18 from Islam, 16 from Paganism and natural spirituality, 16 from Hinduism, 14 from United Methodist Church, 14 from Baptists Church, 10 from Church of the Brethren, 6 from Jewish community, 6 from Old Catholic Church, 3 from Czechoslovak Hussite Church and 2 from Church of Jesus Christ of Latter-day Saints.
