= Luník IX =

Borough in Košice, Slovakia

- Borough
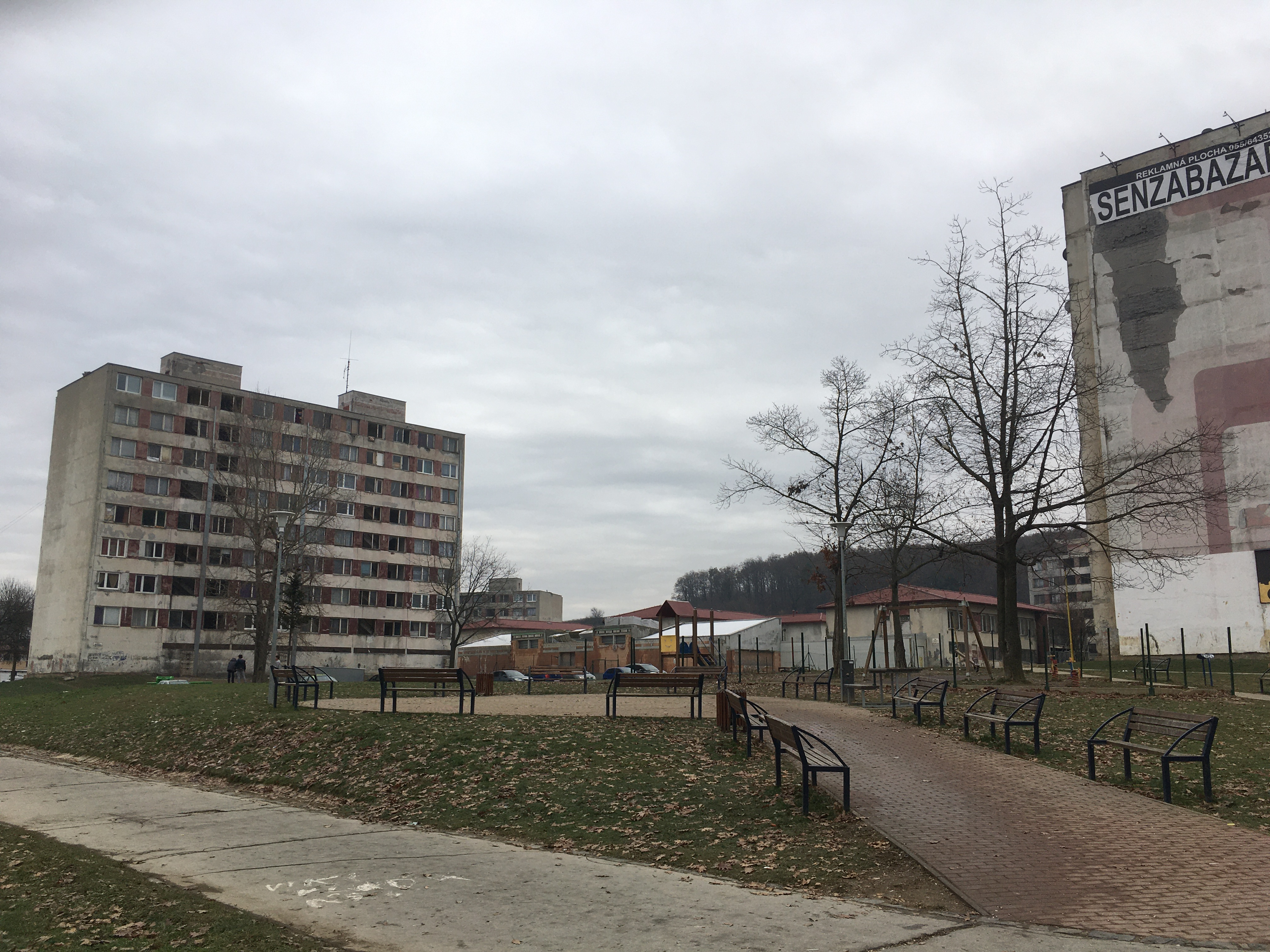
- Luník IX in December 2020

- Flag Coat of arms

- Location within Košice

- Location in Košice Region Location in Slovakia
- Coordinates: 48°41′45″N 21°13′25″E
- Country: Slovakia
- Region: Košice
- District: Košice II
- Housing estate: 1979

Area
  - Total: 1.06 km^{2} (0.41 sq mi)
- Elevation: 244 m (801 ft)

Population (2025)
  - Total: 7,236

Population by ethnicity (2011)
  - Roma: 56.6%
  - Slovak: 32.6%
  - Hungarian: 1.2%
  - Other: 0.2%
  - Unreported: 9.4%

Population by religion (2011)
  - Roman Catholic: 63.4%
  - Assemblies of God: 10.6%
  - Old Catholic: 1.8%
  - Greek Catholic: 1.4%
  - Lutheran: 1.3%
  - Other: 3.1%
  - Non-religious: 2.2%
  - Unreported: 16.2%
- Time zone: UTC+1 (CET)
  - Summer (DST): UTC+2 (CEST)
- Postal code: 040 11
- Area code: +421-55
- Vehicle registration plate (until 2022): KE

Luník IX is a borough (city ward) in the city of Košice, Slovakia, in the Košice II district. It is located in the western-central part of the city, surrounded by the boroughs of Pereš, Myslava, Barca, Juh and Západ.

Luník IX is one of the largest Roma slums in Europe.

== Characteristics ==
Top 3 Slovak municipalities by Romani population
City	Population
Jarovnice	4,176(57.67%)
Luník IX	3,073(43.67%)
Rakúsy	2,248(70.76%)

Luník IX houses one of the largest communities of Romani people in Slovakia. Although originally built for 2,500 inhabitants, it is estimated that the population is now three times larger. Living standards are low, with services such as gas, water, and electricity cut off, as the majority of inhabitants are not paying rent or utilities fees and the utilities infrastructure has been ransacked to sell for scrap.

Health standards are low, and diseases such as hepatitis, head lice, diarrhea, scabies and meningitis are common. Unemployment in the borough reaches almost 100 percent. It has one elementary school and a kindergarten.

Luník IX is serviced by a bus line, which stops only on selected bus stops. Boarding the bus is only allowed through the front door. Due to frequent attacks of aggressive residents, bus drivers deployed on the line receive hazard pay.

== History ==
The Romani village close to the borough was demolished in 1979 and the Romani people were moved into Luník IX; in addition, there was a landfill nearby. As early as in the 1980s the Romani comprised half of the population, which was around 2,000. Over time, the non-Romani population gradually moved away, with the Romani taking flats after their departure, and the borough turned into a Romani ghetto.

In 1995, the city council of Košice created a plan for the living conditions of dodgers, the maladjusted, and people from illegally occupied flats around Košice. They were to be moved into Luník IX, with "non-problematic" families being gradually moved out if they requested it. The realization of this plan is on-going.

According to data from 2019, the vast majority of the municipality's population consists of the local Roma community, when they constituted an estimated 100% of the local population.

In September 2021, Pope Francis visited the settlement and delivered an address to the inhabitants during his first papal trip to Slovakia.

== Statistics ==
- Area: 1.07 square kilometres (0.41 sq mi)
- Population: 6,411 (December 2017)
- Density of population: 6,000/km² (December 2017)
- District: Košice II
- Mayor: Marcel Šaňa (as of 2018 elections)

== Geography ==
The municipality lies at an altitude of 244 metres (801 ft) and covers an area of 1.06 km^{2} (0.41 sq mi) (2025).

== Population ==
Population statistic (10 years)
Year	1995	2005	2015	2025
Count	0	5368	6304	7236
Difference		–	+17.43%	+14.78%

Population statistic
Year	2024	2025
Count	7185	7236
Difference		+0.70%

It has a population of 7236 people (31 December 2025).

=== Ethnicity ===
Census 2021 (1+ %)
Ethnicity	Number	Fraction
Romani	3419	48.58%
Not found out	2885	40.99%
Slovak	1559	22.15%
Total	7037	

In year 2021 was 7037 people by ethnicity 3419 as Romani, 2885 as Not found out, 1559 as Slovak, 5 as Czech, 3 as Other, 2 as Rusyn, 1 as Ukrainian, 1 as Hungarian and 1 as English.

Note on population: The difference values of population numbers in the table "Population statistic" and in the sections "Ethnicity" & "Religion" is caused by the use of various statistical methods.

=== Religion ===
Census 2021 (1+ %)
Religion	Number	Fraction
Not found out	4120	58.55%
Roman Catholic Church	1667	23.69%
None	1002	14.24%
Total	7037	

In year 2021 was 7037 people by religion 4120 from Not found out, 1667 from Roman Catholic Church, 1002 from None, 70 from Evangelical Church, 59 from Christian Congregations in Slovakia, 55 from Greek Catholic Church, 19 from Apostolic Church, 15 from Jehovah's Witnesses, 12 from Other and not ascertained christian church, 9 from Calvinist Church, 3 from Eastern Orthodox Church, 3 from United Methodist Church, 1 from Old Catholic Church, 1 from New Apostolic Church and 1 from Church of Jesus Christ of Latter-day Saints.

== Gallery ==
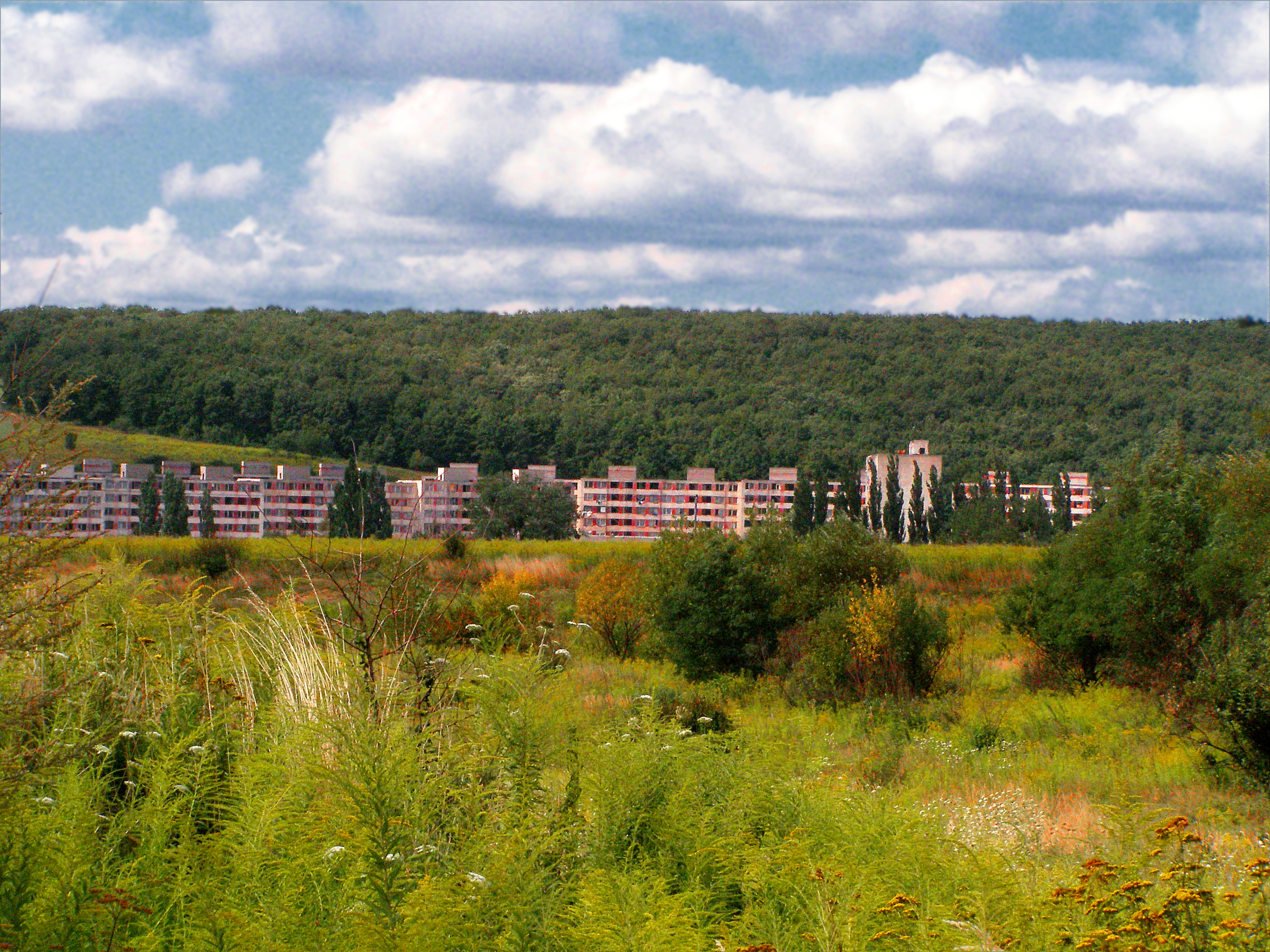
Housing estate in the Luník IX borough seen from the surrounding area

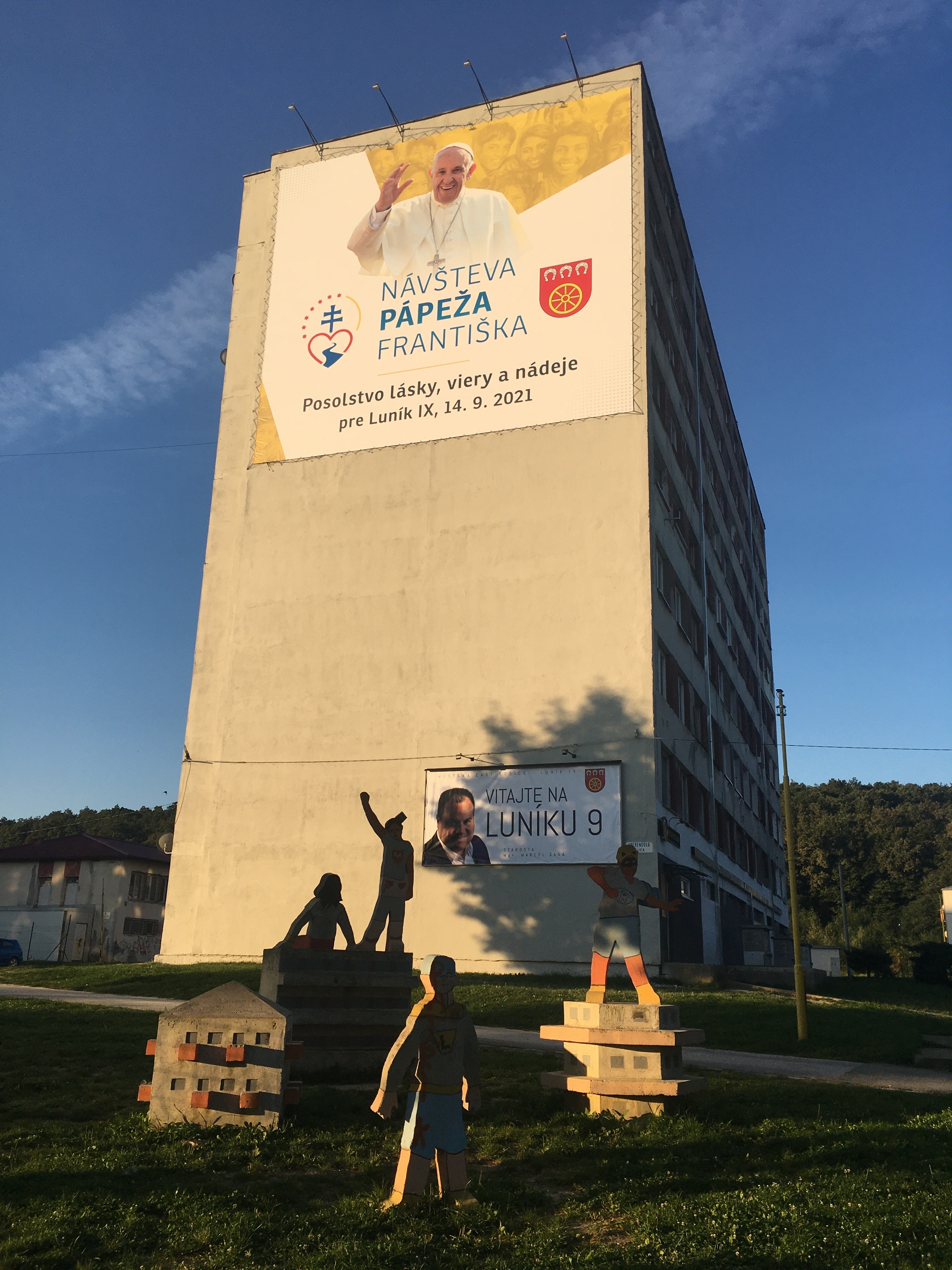
One of the houses during papal visit (2021)

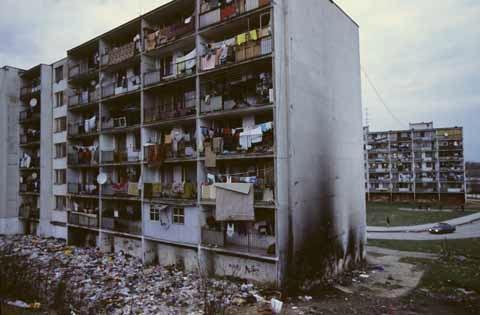
Situation in October 2000

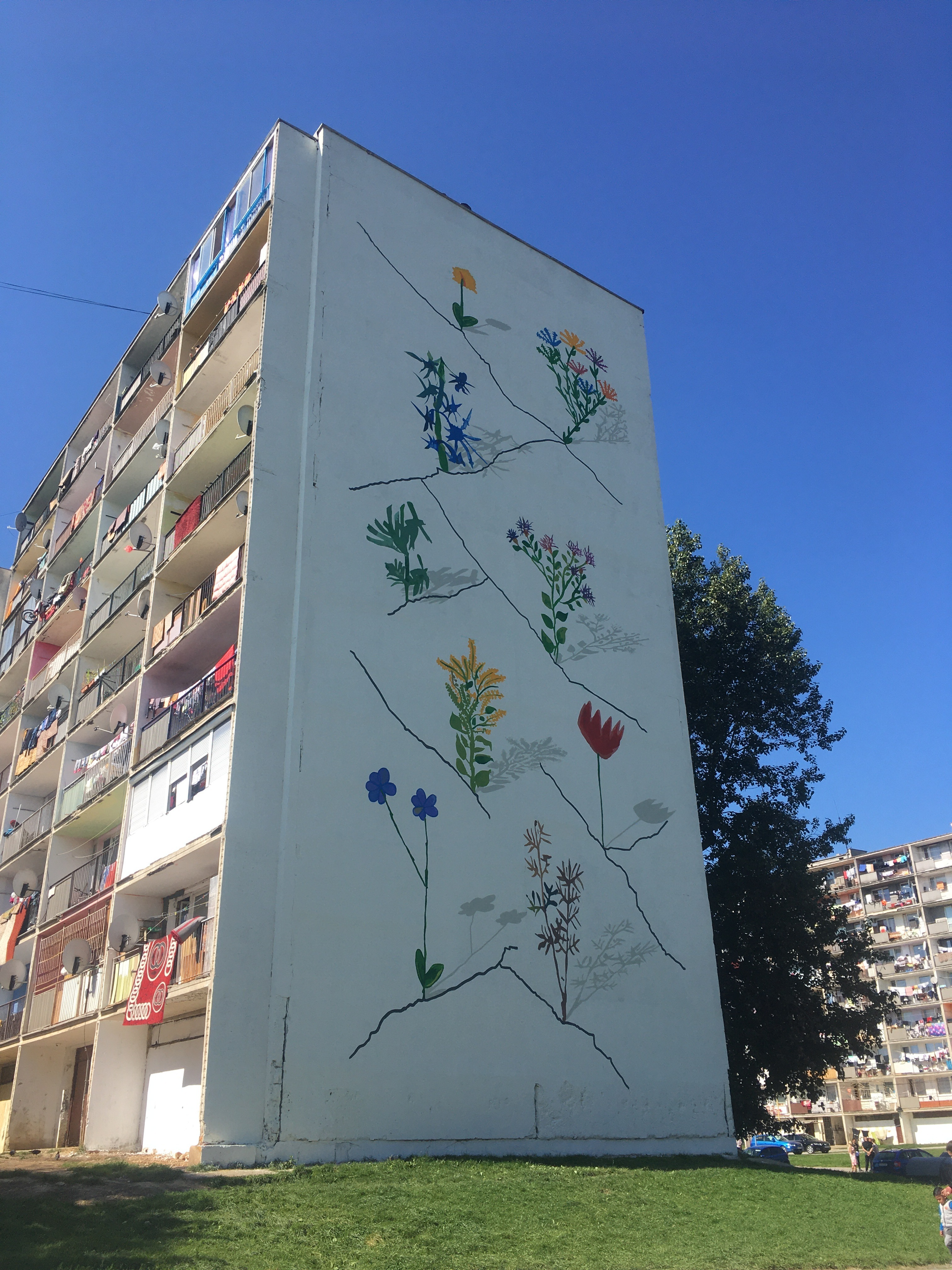
Mural painting
