= Vyšné Opátske =

Coordinates: 48°42′N 21°17′E

- Borough
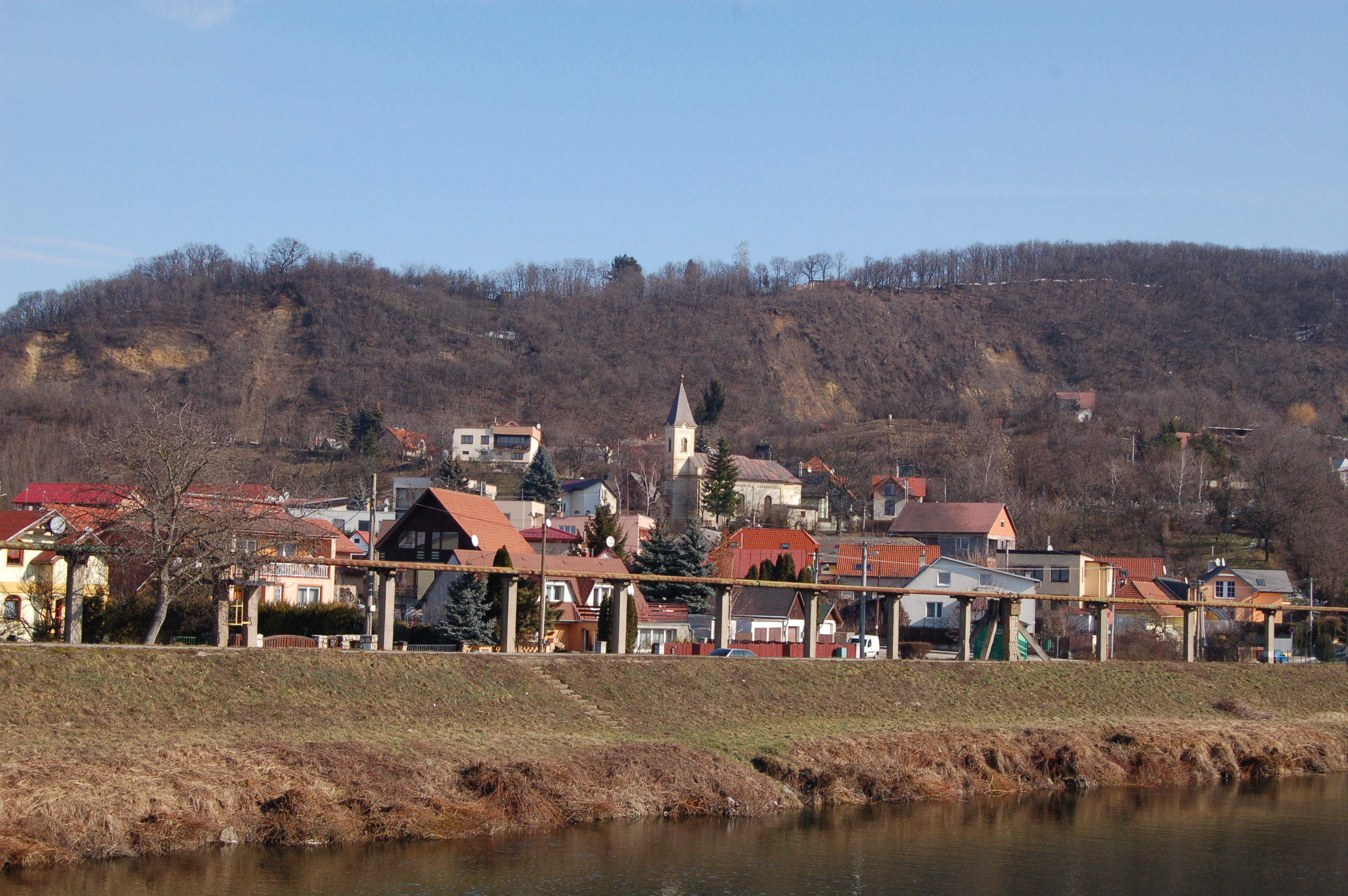
- Panorama of Vyšné Opátske (February 2013)

- Flag Coat of arms

- Location within Košice

- Location of Vyšné Opátske in Slovakia
- Country: Slovakia
- Region: Košice
- District: Košice IV
- Village: 1344 (first known record)

Area
  - Total: 4.20 km^{2} (1.62 sq mi)
- Elevation: 210 m (690 ft)

Population (2025)
  - Total: 2,871
- Time zone: UTC+1 (CET)
  - Summer (DST): UTC+2 (CEST)
- Postal code: 040 01
- Area code: +421-55
- Vehicle registration plate (until 2022): KE
- Website: www.vysneopatske.sk

Vyšné Opátske (Hungarian: Szilvásapáti) is a borough (city ward) of Košice, Slovakia. Located in the Košice IV district, it lies at an altitude of roughly 210 metres (690 ft) above sea level, and borders the boroughs of Old Town, Dargovských hrdinov, Košická Nová Ves, Krásna, Nad jazerom and Košice-Juh. Vyšné Opátske has a mostly rural character, with a population of nearly 2,500 inhabitants.

== History ==
The village of Vyšné Opátske first appeared in written records in 1344.

In the 20th century, Vyšné Opátske lost village municipality status and was annexed to Košice as one of its boroughs.

== Statistics ==
- Area: 4.19 square kilometres (1.62 sq mi)
- Population: 2,480 (31 December 2017)
- Density of population: 590/km^{2} (31 December 2017)
- District: Košice IV
- Mayor: Viktor Mikluš (as of 2018 elections)

== Geography ==
The municipality lies at an altitude of 210 metres (690 ft) and covers an area of 4.20 km^{2} (1.62 sq mi) (2025).

== Population ==
Population statistic (10 years)
Year	1995	2005	2015	2025
Count	0	1567	2358	2871
Difference		–	+50.47%	+21.75%

Population statistic
Year	2024	2025
Count	2779	2871
Difference		+3.31%

It has a population of 2871 people (31 December 2025).

=== Ethnicity ===
Census 2021 (1+ %)
Ethnicity	Number	Fraction
Slovak	2405	91.34%
Not found out	150	5.69%
Hungarian	61	2.31%
Rusyn	54	2.05%
Total	2633	

In year 2021 was 2633 people by ethnicity 2405 as Slovak, 150 as Not found out, 61 as Hungarian, 54 as Rusyn, 21 as Czech, 17 as Ukrainian, 16 as Romani, 12 as Other, 9 as Russian, 8 as German, 4 as Polish, 4 as Bulgarian, 3 as Jewish, 3 as Romanian, 3 as French, 2 as Serbian, 2 as Greek, 1 as Italian and 1 as Albanian.

Note on population: The difference values of population numbers in the table "Population statistic" and in the sections "Ethnicity" & "Religion" is caused by the use of various statistical methods.

=== Religion ===
Census 2021 (1+ %)
Religion	Number	Fraction
Roman Catholic Church	1263	47.97%
None	801	30.42%
Greek Catholic Church	214	8.13%
Not found out	173	6.57%
Evangelical Church	71	2.7%
Eastern Orthodox Church	45	1.71%
Calvinist Church	31	1.18%
Total	2633	

In year 2021 was 2633 people by religion 1263 from Roman Catholic Church, 801 from None, 214 from Greek Catholic Church, 173 from Not found out, 71 from Evangelical Church, 45 from Eastern Orthodox Church, 31 from Calvinist Church, 7 from Other and not ascertained christian church, 6 from Ad hoc movements, 4 from Jehovah's Witnesses, 4 from Buddhism, 3 from Christian Congregations in Slovakia, 3 from Other, 2 from Paganism and natural spirituality, 1 from Islam, 1 from Czechoslovak Hussite Church, 1 from Church of the Brethren, 1 from Seventh-day Adventist Church, 1 from Church of Jesus Christ of Latter-day Saints and 1 from Apostolic Church.
