= FK Košice – Krásna =

- Full name: Futbalový klub Košice – Krásna
- Founded: 2010
- Dissolved: 2015 (merged with FK Šaca to FK Krásna)
- Ground: Štadión Krásna, Krásna, Košice
- Chairman: Ján Trnovský
- Manager: Tomáš Danko
- League: 3. liga
- 2014-15: 4. liga, 1st (promoted)

FK Košice – Krásna was a Slovak football team, based in the town of Krásna. The club was founded in 2010.
