= Nad jazerom =

Nad jazerom Košice – mestská časť Nad jazerom Košice-Nad jazerom
- Borough
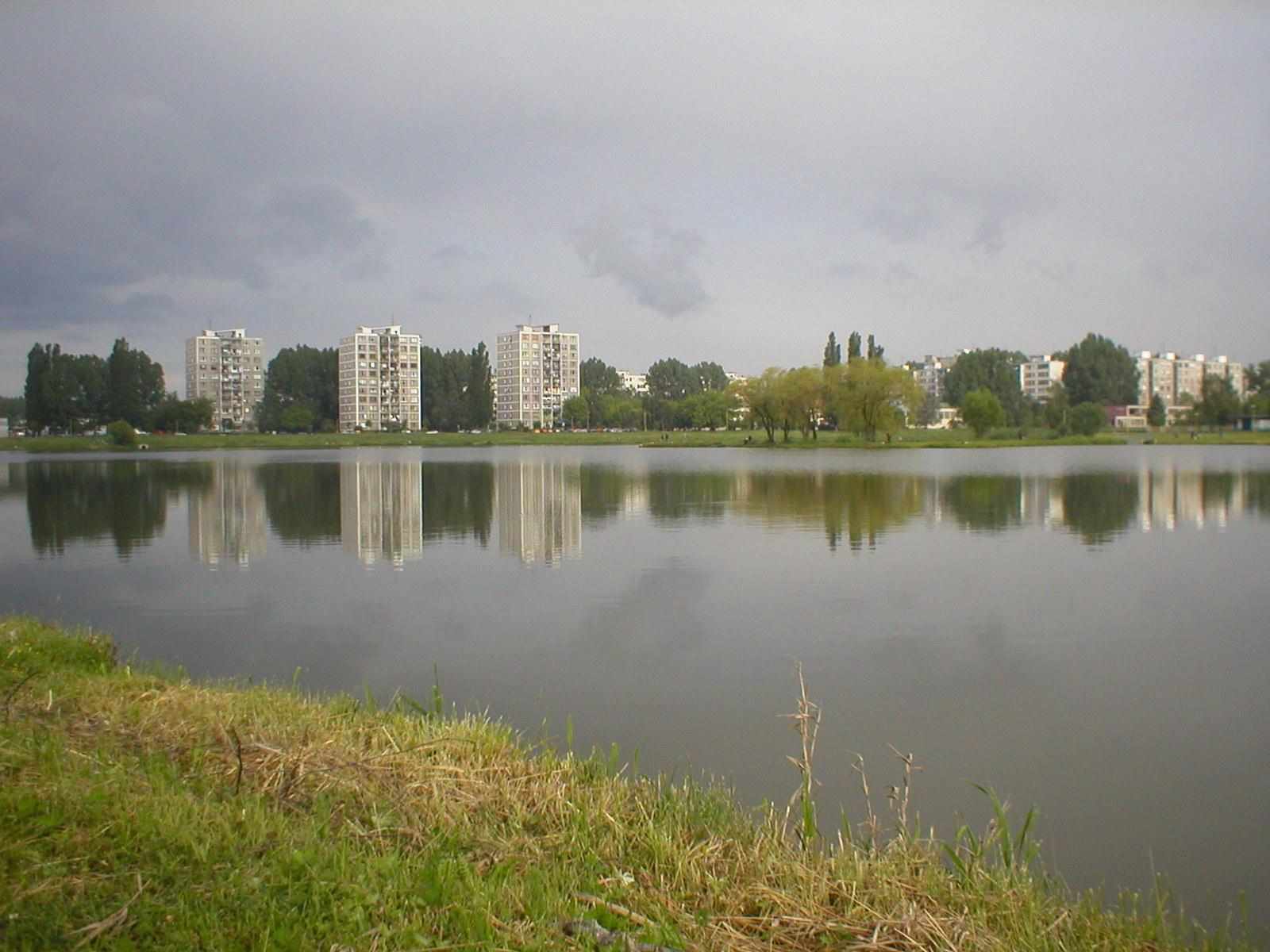
- The lake and a housing estate at Nad jazerom

- Flag Coat of arms

- Location within Košice

- Location of Nad jazerom in Slovakia
- Country: Slovakia
- Region: Košice
- District: Košice IV
- Locality: 1275 (first known record)
- Borough: 1969

Area
  - Total: 3.66 km^{2} (1.41 sq mi)
- Elevation: 193 m (633 ft)

Population (2025)
  - Total: 21,391
- Time zone: UTC+1 (CET)
  - Summer (DST): UTC+2 (CEST)
- Postal code: 040 12
- Area code: +421-55
- Vehicle registration plate (until 2022): KE
- Website: www.jazerokosice.sk

Nad jazerom, officially Košice – mestská časť Nad jazerom, shortened to Košice-Nad jazerom (literally: "Košice – borough Above the Lake", Hungarian: Tóvárosi lakótelep) is a borough (city ward) of Košice, Slovakia. The borough is situated in the Košice IV district and lies to the southeast and south of the neighbouring boroughs of Košice-Juh and Vyšné Opátske, at an altitude of roughly 192 metres (630 ft) above sea level. The name of the borough is derived from a water reservoir called Jazero, which was originally excavated for the extraction of gravel.

== History ==
The locality that became the borough of Nad jazerom first appeared in written records in 1275.

Nad jazerom began as a borough of Košice in the late 1960s, particularly with the development of the local housing estates.

== Statistics ==
- Area: 3.66 square kilometres (1.41 sq mi)
- Population: 24,803 (31 December 2017)
- Density of population: 6,800/km^{2} (31 December 2017)
- District: Košice IV
- Mayor: Lenka Kovačevičová (as of 2018 elections)

== Geography ==
The municipality lies at an altitude of 193 metres (633 ft) and covers an area of 3.66 km^{2} (1.41 sq mi) (2025).

== Population ==
Population statistic (10 years)
Year	1995	2005	2015	2025
Count	0	24,676	25,213	21,391
Difference		–	+2.17%	−15.15%

Population statistic
Year	2024	2025
Count	21,721	21,391
Difference		−1.51%

It has a population of 21,391 people (31 December 2025).

=== Ethnicity ===
Census 2021 (1+ %)
Ethnicity	Number	Fraction
Slovak	19,852	87.5%
Not found out	2106	9.28%
Hungarian	714	3.14%
Rusyn	428	1.88%
Total	22,686	

In year 2021 was 22,686 people by ethnicity 19,852 as Slovak, 2106 as Not found out, 714 as Hungarian, 428 as Rusyn, 192 as Czech, 121 as Romani, 85 as Ukrainian, 77 as Other, 44 as Russian, 38 as German, 35 as Polish, 17 as Jewish, 16 as English, 10 as Vietnamese, 8 as Moravian, 8 as Bulgarian, 7 as Serbian, 6 as Romanian, 4 as Italian, 3 as Chinese, 3 as Austrian, 3 as Croatian, 2 as Greek, 2 as Albanian, 1 as Irish, 1 as Turkish and 1 as Iranian.

Note on population: The difference values of population numbers in the table "Population statistic" and in the sections "Ethnicity" & "Religion" is caused by the use of various statistical methods.

=== Religion ===
Census 2021 (1+ %)
Religion	Number	Fraction
Roman Catholic Church	10,257	45.21%
None	6313	27.83%
Not found out	2304	10.16%
Greek Catholic Church	1703	7.51%
Evangelical Church	736	3.24%
Calvinist Church	470	2.07%
Eastern Orthodox Church	323	1.42%
Total	22,686	

In year 2021 was 22,686 people by religion 10,257 from Roman Catholic Church, 6313 from None, 2304 from Not found out, 1703 from Greek Catholic Church, 736 from Evangelical Church, 470 from Calvinist Church, 323 from Eastern Orthodox Church, 94 from Apostolic Church, 78 from Jehovah's Witnesses, 74 from Other and not ascertained christian church, 73 from Ad hoc movements, 70 from Other, 32 from Christian Congregations in Slovakia, 24 from Buddhism, 21 from Church of the Brethren, 20 from Islam, 20 from Seventh-day Adventist Church, 17 from Baptists Church, 16 from Paganism and natural spirituality, 15 from Jewish community, 13 from United Methodist Church, 4 from Czechoslovak Hussite Church, 3 from Old Catholic Church, 3 from Bahá'i Community, 2 from Hinduism and 1 from Church of Jesus Christ of Latter-day Saints.

== Gallery ==
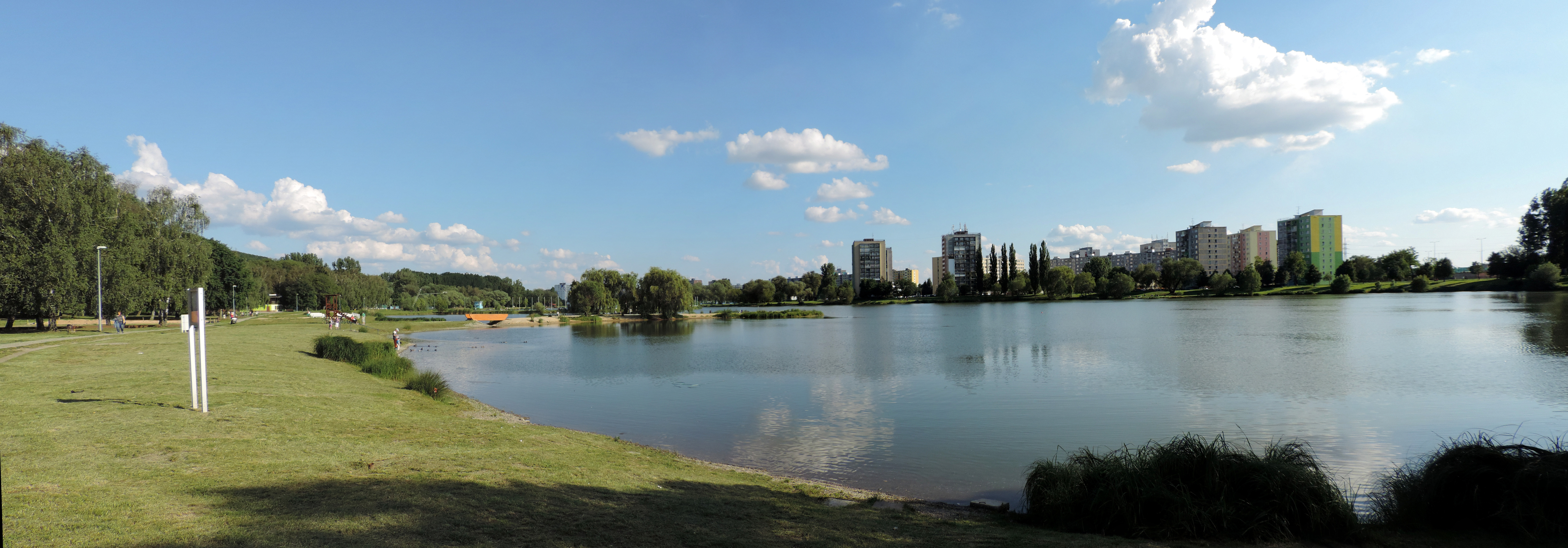
The lake at Nad jazerom

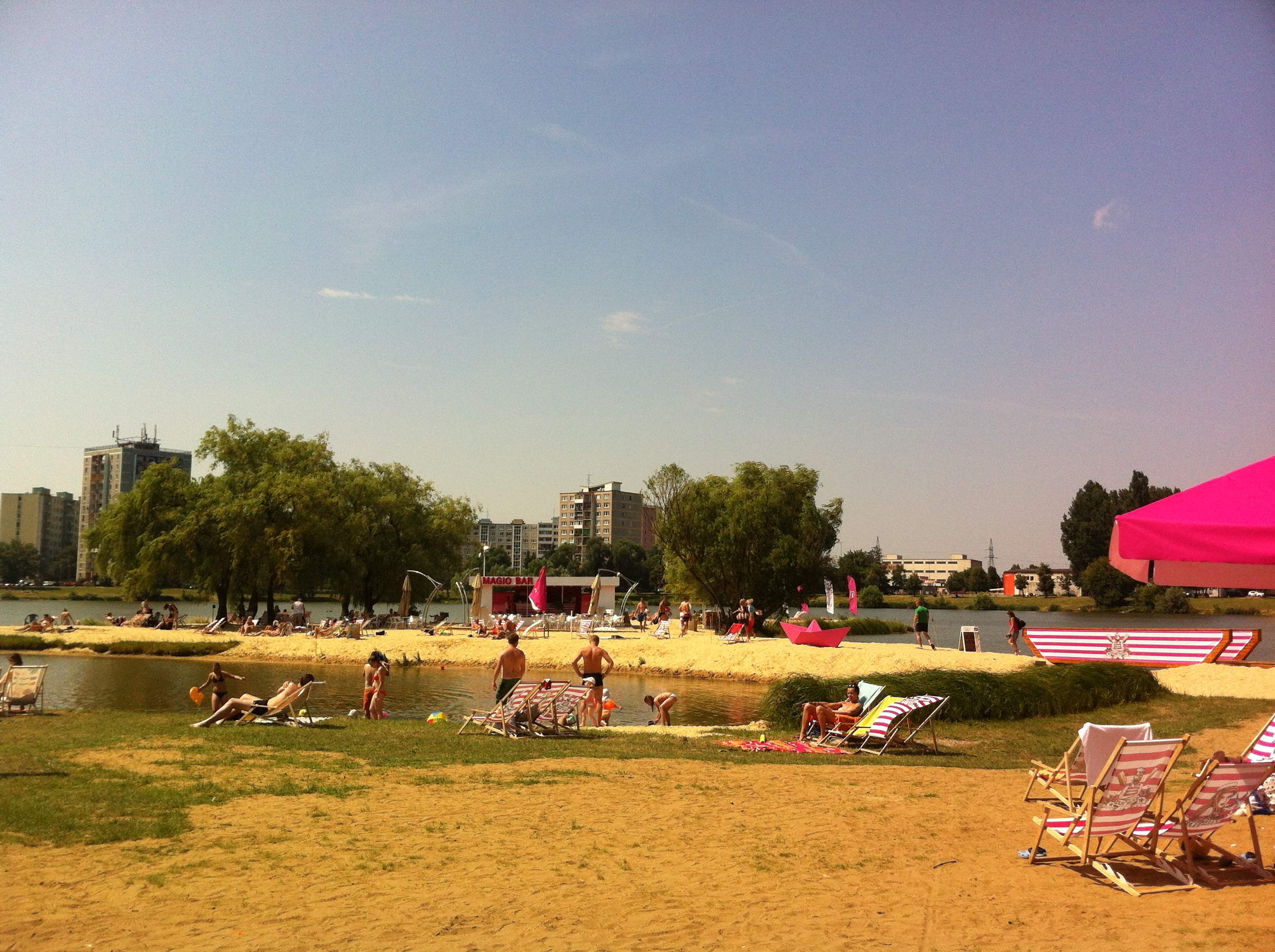
The lake at Nad jazerom

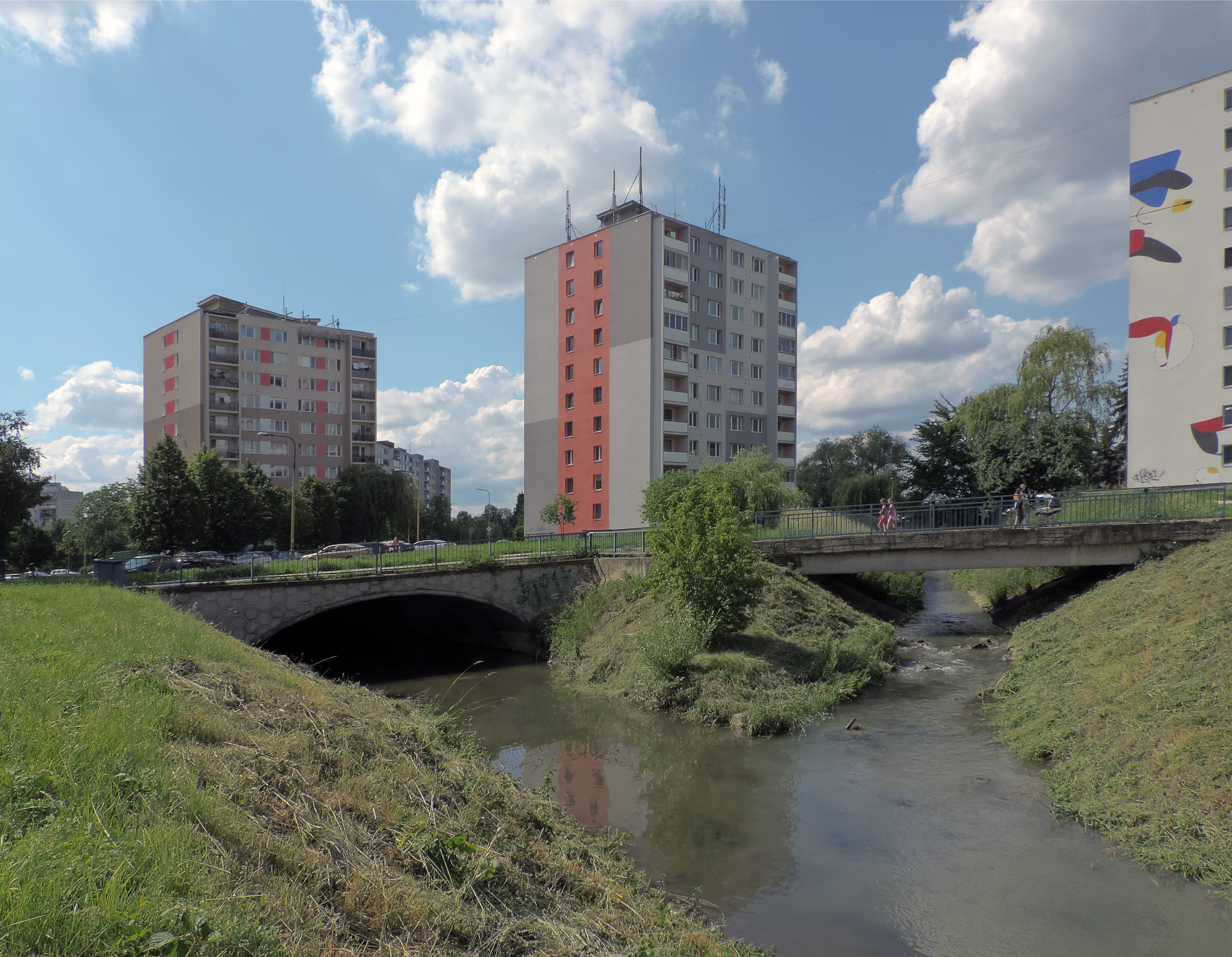
Housing estates at Nad jazerom

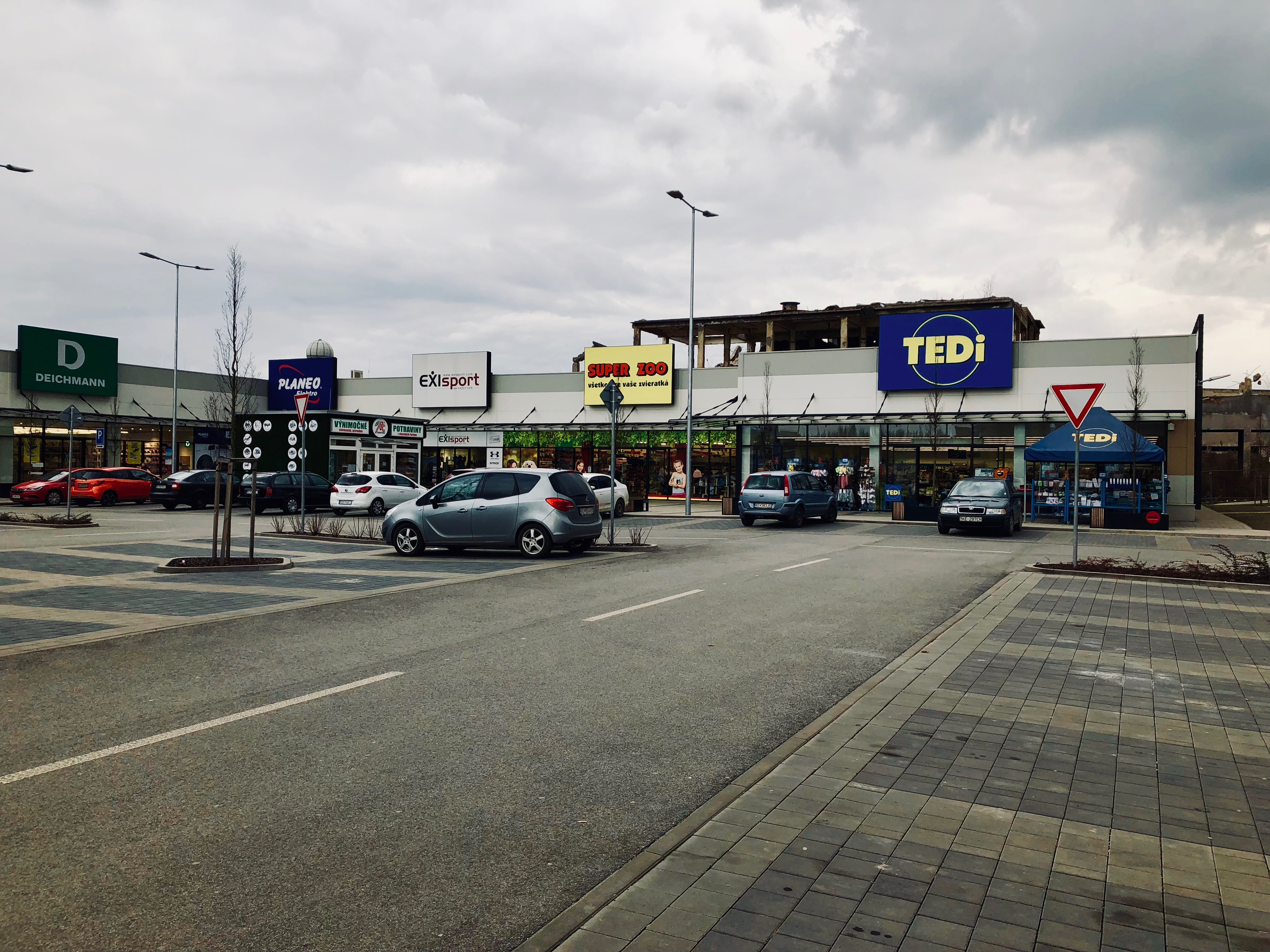
A local shopping centre in Nad jazerom

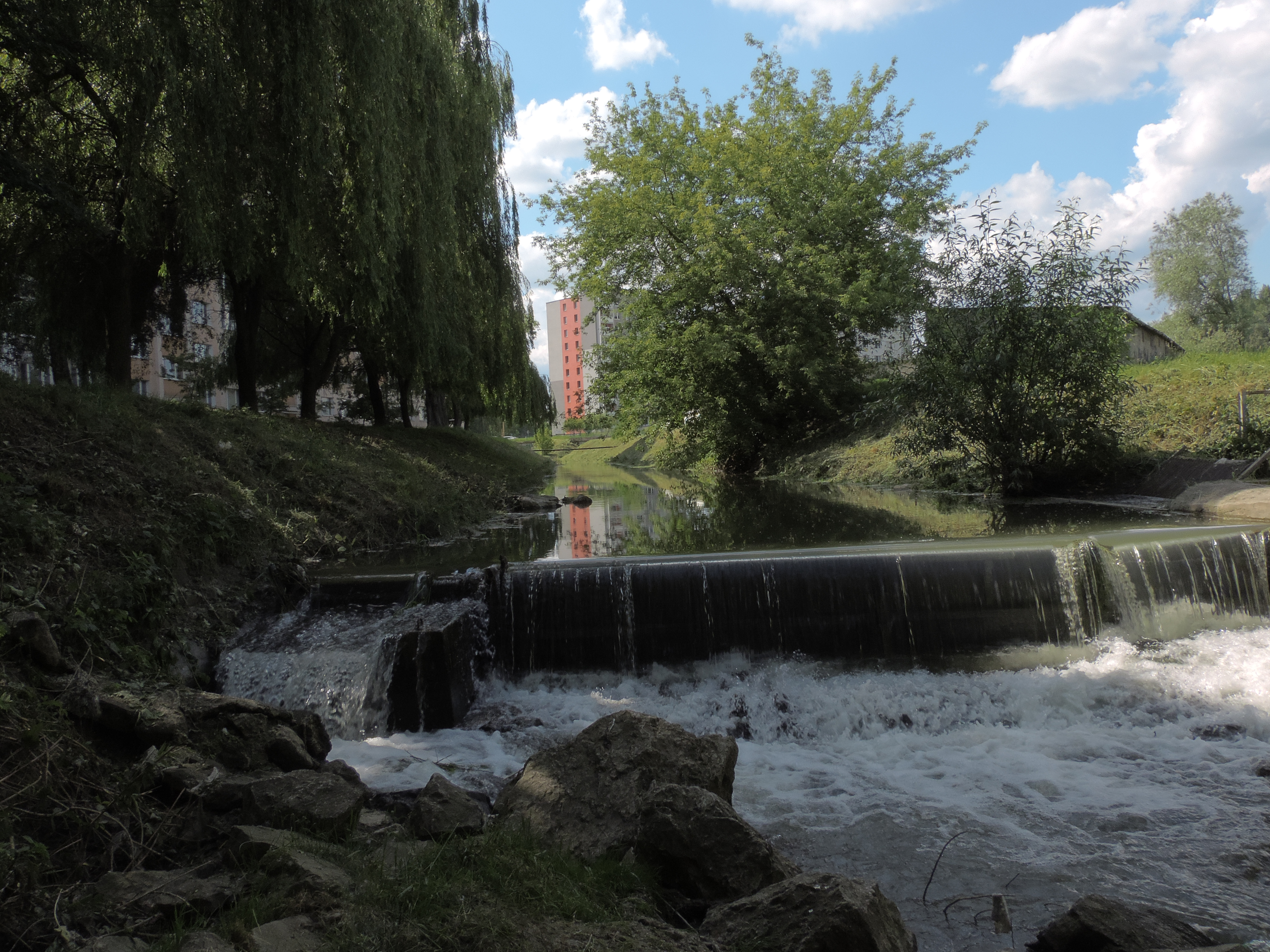
