= Košice IV =

Coordinates: 48.672°N 21.296°E

Košice IV District
- District
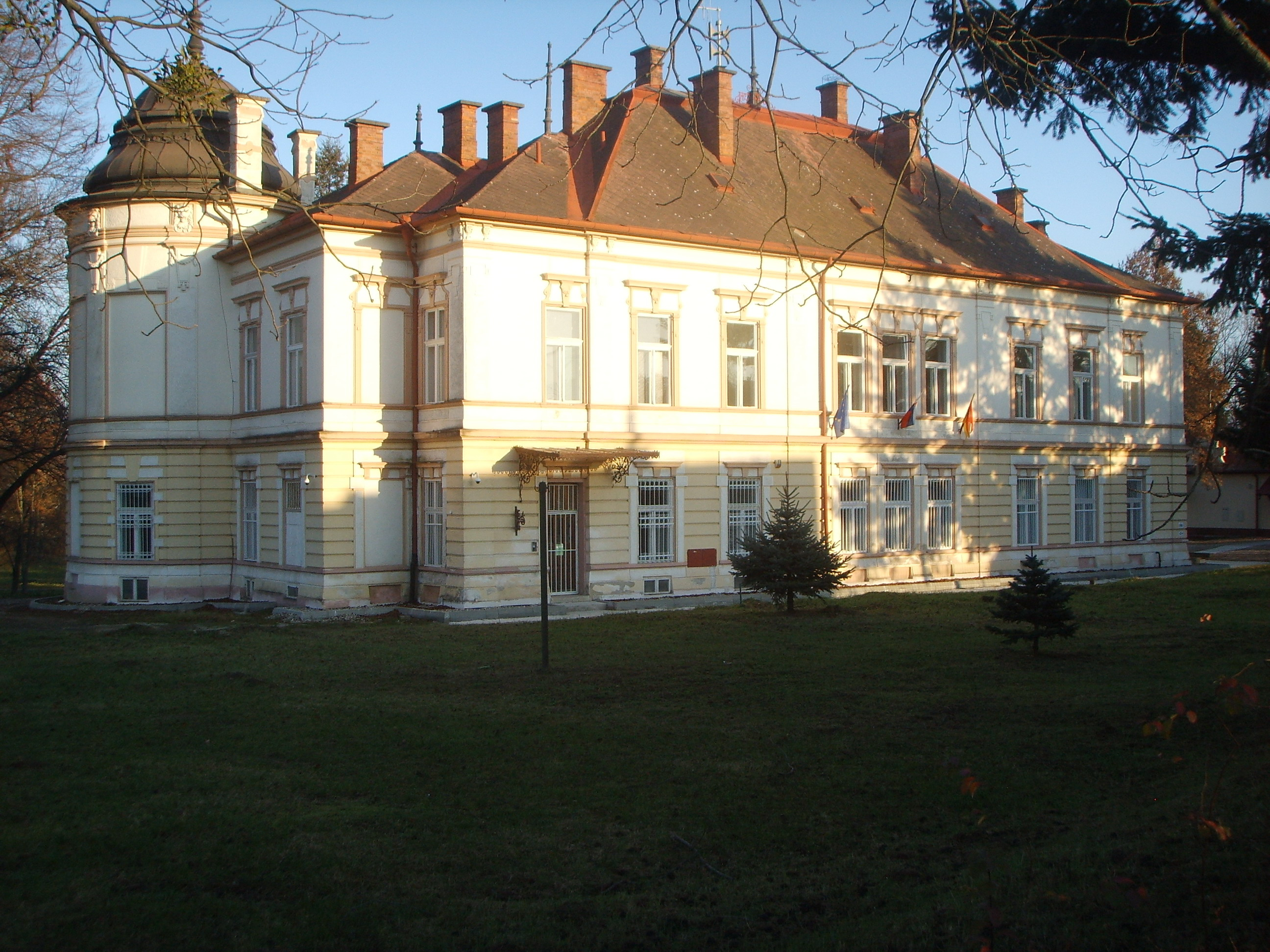
- Country: Slovakia
- Region (kraj): Košice Region
- Seat: Košice

Area
  - Total: 60.90 km^{2} (23.51 sq mi)

Population (2025)
  - Total: 55,510
- Time zone: UTC+1 (CET)
  - Summer (DST): UTC+2 (CEST)
- Telephone prefix: 055
- Vehicle registration plate (until 2022): KE
- Boroughs: 6

Košice IV (Hungarian: Kassai IV. járás) is a district in the Košice Region of eastern Slovakia, in the city of Košice. It is bordered by the Košice I, Košice II, Košice III and Košice-okolie districts. Until 1918, the district was mostly part of the Hungarian county of Abaúj-Torna.

== Population ==
Historical population
Year	Pop.	±%
1970	30,284	—
1980	65,687	+116.9%
1991	60,790	−7.5%
2001	57,236	−5.8%
2011	59,242	+3.5%
2021	57,015	−3.8%
Source: Censuses

Population statistic (10 years)
Year	1995	2005	2015	2025
Count	60,642	56,420	59,820	55,510
Difference		−6.96%	+6.02%	−7.20%

Population statistic
Year	2024	2025
Count	55,825	55,510
Difference		−0.56%

It has a population of 55,510 people (31 December 2025).

=== Ethnicity ===
Census 2021 (1+ %)
Ethnicity	Number	Fraction
Slovak	49,321	82.27%
Not found out	5362	8.94%
Hungarian	2091	3.48%
Rusyn	981	1.63%
Total	59,943	

In year 2021 was 59,943 people by ethnicity 49,321 as Slovak, 5362 as Not found out, 2091 as Hungarian, 981 as Rusyn, 529 as Czech, 526 as Romani, 250 as Other, 228 as Ukrainian, 134 as German, 113 as Russian, 83 as Vietnamese, 65 as Polish, 49 as Jewish, 28 as English, 25 as Chinese, 20 as French, 19 as Italian, 17 as Bulgarian, 15 as Moravian, 13 as Albanian, 11 as Serbian, 11 as Romanian, 11 as Austrian, 11 as Canadian, 8 as Greek, 7 as Irish, 5 as Turkish, 4 as Croatian, 3 as Silesian and 3 as Iranian.

Note on population: The difference values of population numbers in the table "Population statistic" and in the sections "Ethnicity" & "Religion" is caused by the use of various statistical methods.

=== Religion ===
Census 2021 (1+ %)
Religion	Number	Fraction
Roman Catholic Church	26,745	46.91%
None	15,500	27.19%
Not found out	5732	10.05%
Greek Catholic Church	3894	6.83%
Evangelical Church	1790	3.14%
Calvinist Church	1267	2.22%
Eastern Orthodox Church	643	1.13%
Total	57,015	

In year 2021 was 57,015 people by religion 26,745 from Roman Catholic Church, 15,500 from None, 5732 from Not found out, 3894 from Greek Catholic Church, 1790 from Evangelical Church, 1267 from Calvinist Church, 643 from Eastern Orthodox Church, 226 from Jehovah's Witnesses, 190 from Ad hoc movements, 187 from Other, 175 from Other and not ascertained christian church, 149 from Apostolic Church, 102 from Buddhism, 84 from Christian Congregations in Slovakia, 67 from Jewish community, 46 from Baptists Church, 45 from Islam, 42 from Seventh-day Adventist Church, 35 from Paganism and natural spirituality, 33 from Church of the Brethren, 26 from United Methodist Church, 12 from Czechoslovak Hussite Church, 9 from Old Catholic Church, 7 from Hinduism, 4 from Church of Jesus Christ of Latter-day Saints, 4 from Bahá'i Community and 1 from New Apostolic Church.

== Boroughs ==
Borough	Area [km^{2}]	Population
Barca	17.96	3,623
Juh	9.74	20,442
Krásna	20.10	6,396
Nad jazerom	3.66	21,391
Vyšné Opátske	4.20	2,871
Šebastovce	4.44	787

Population and area values are current for year 2025.
