= Jazero (Košice) =

Lake in Košice, Slovakia

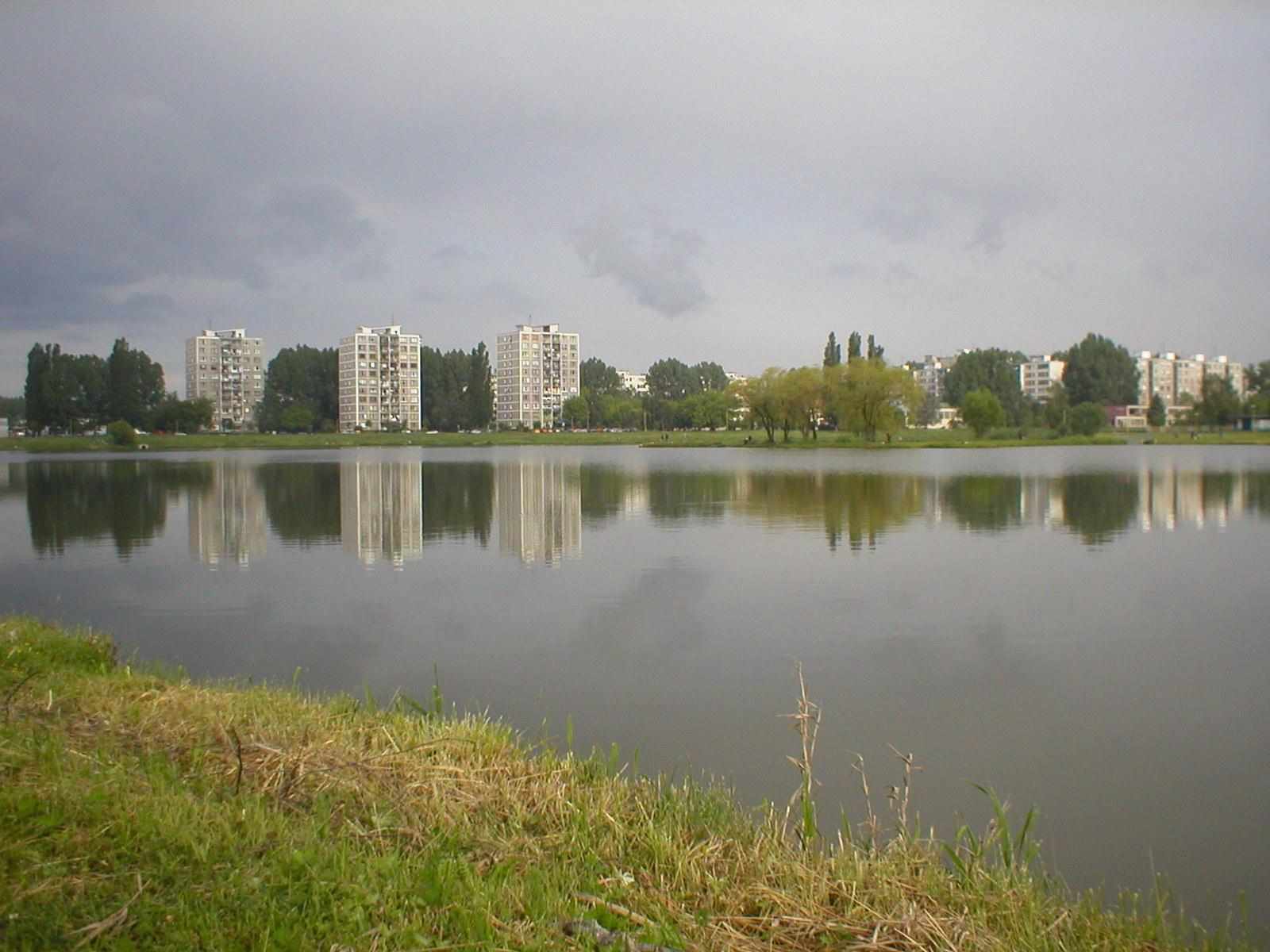

- Location within Slovakia
- Location: Košice, Slovakia
- Coordinates: 48°41′31″N 21°17′14″E
- Type: reservoir
- Surface area: 0.204659 km^{2} (0.079019 sq mi)

Jazero (literally: "The lake") is a reservoir, which was created in the second half of the 20th century, located in the Nad jazerom borough (city ward) of Košice, Slovakia.

== Characteristics ==
Jazero is the dominant feature of this part of the city and is set in the recreational area with the same name. This recreational area includes a cable skiing system, a boat rental provider, a sandy beach, multifunctional playgrounds, children's and full-size volleyball courts, and a number of catering facilities that are open to visitors during the summer. If the water is of good quality, you can bathe in it. During the swimming season, a lifeguard and rescue service is available. Between the lake and the river Hornad, there is a wooded area with footpaths and Fire pits for grilling as well as a cycle path for cycling and rollerblading. Fishing in allowed, provided that a license has been purchased.

The cable skiing system, operated by Trixen, is used for both competition and recreational water skiing.

Košické Benátky (literally: "Kosice Venice") is an annual event in which non-traditional sailing vessels are presented upon the lake.
