= Holy Spirit Church (Košice) =

Coordinates: 48.714969°N 21.261457°E

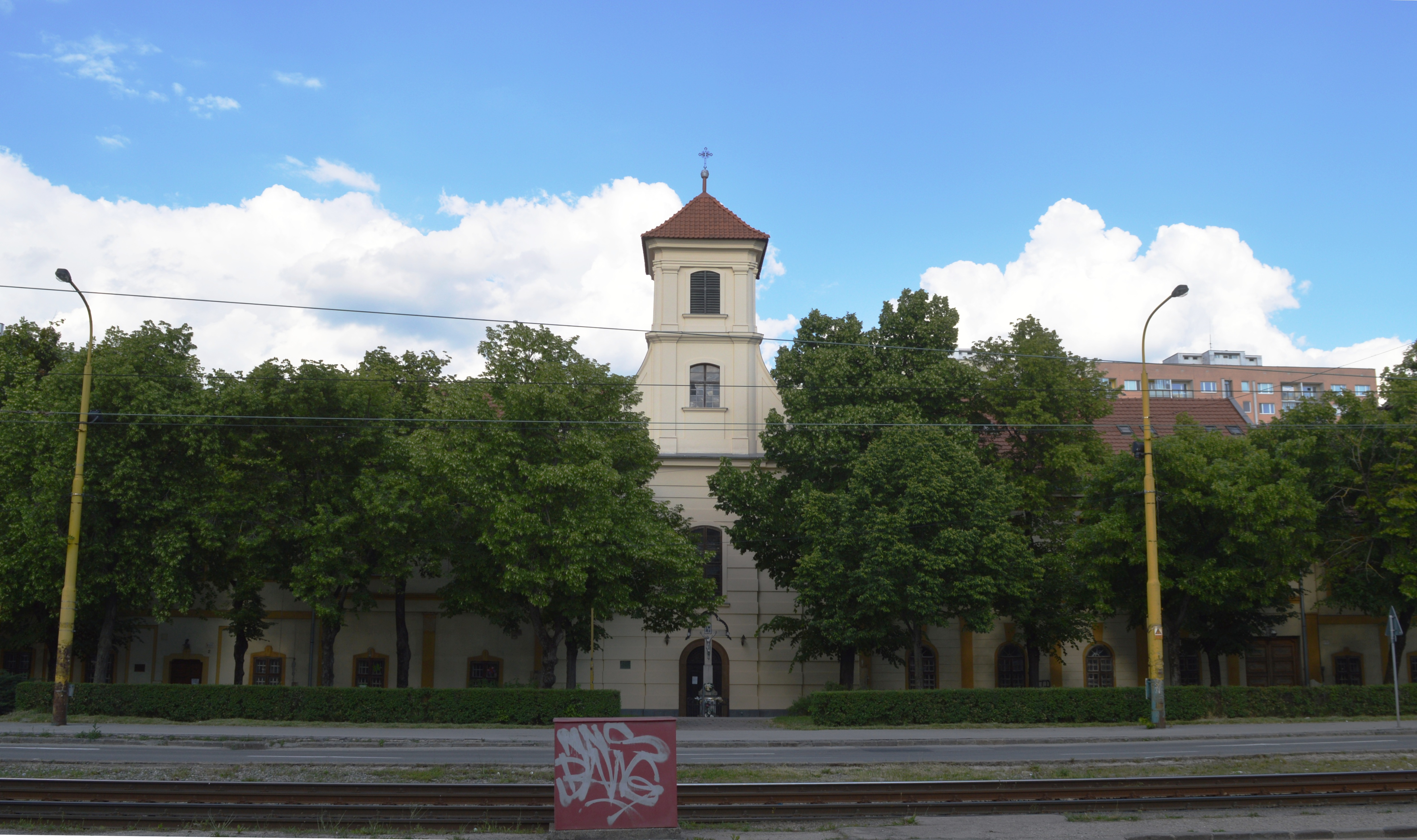
The Holy Spirit Church in 2021

The Holy Spirit Church (Slovak: Kostol svätého Ducha) or Hospital Church of the Holy Spirit (Slovak: Špitálsky kostol svätého Ducha) is the oldest building in Košice-Juh, Košice, Slovakia. It is located at beginning of Južná trieda (South Avenue), close to the historic centre of medieval Košice.

== Interior ==
It is a baroque church erected between 1730 and 1733. The capacity of the interior is 200 people. The vault painting shows a view of Košice of the first third of the 18th century, when the town was surrounded by high town walls. The whole church emanates the atmosphere of a bygone era.

== Hospital ==
The church is situated in the axis of former hospital buildings erected in the 13th century. The hospital there used to a charity organization for the very old, the poor, orphans, the homeless, the sick. The hospital was situated outside the town walls and the church was a part of it from the beginning. Unfortunately, it was pulled down in the beginning of the 18th century.

At present, a house for pensioners is placed in the building.

== Gallery ==
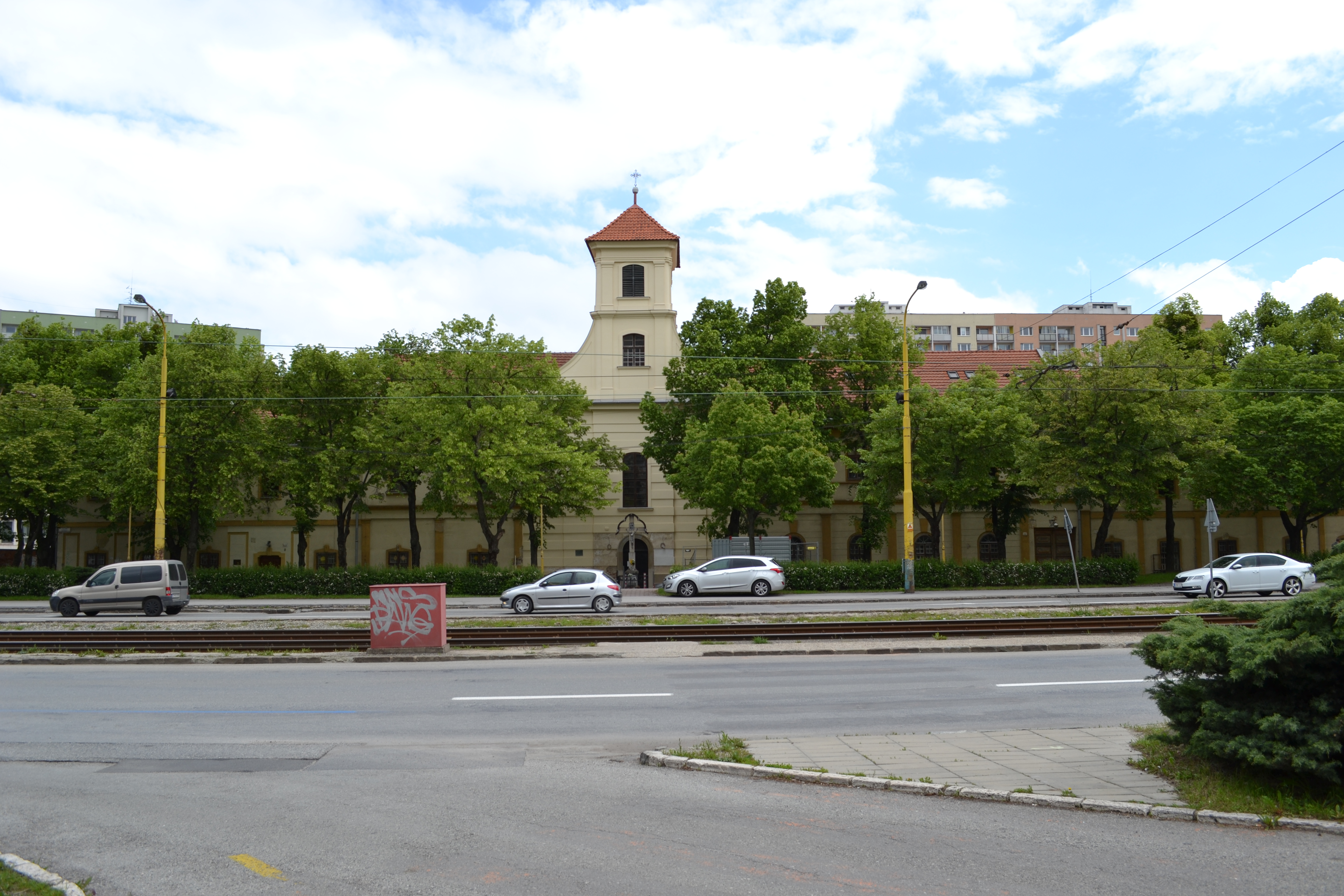
Holy Spirit Church from a distance

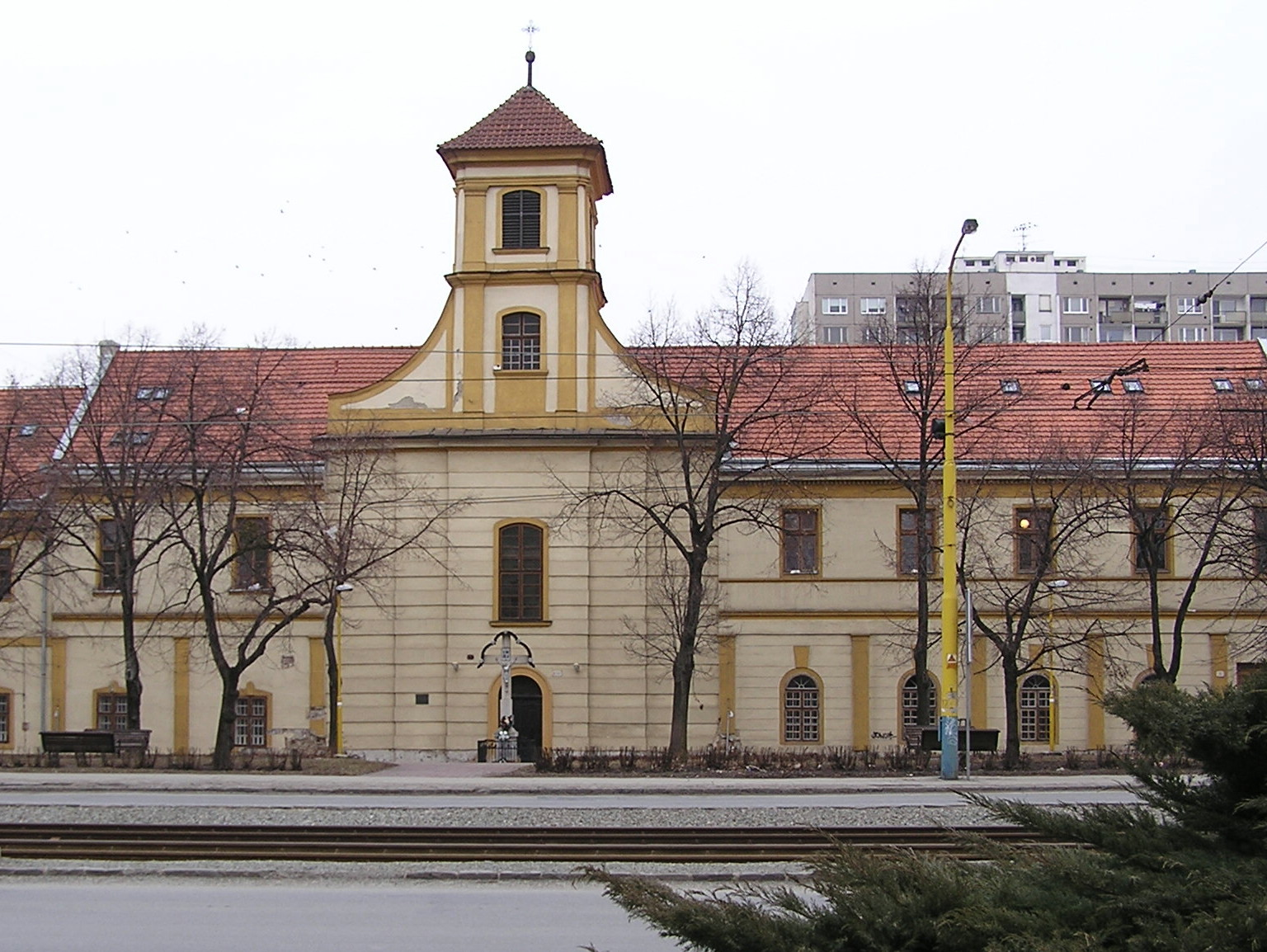
Holy Spirit Church in 2006

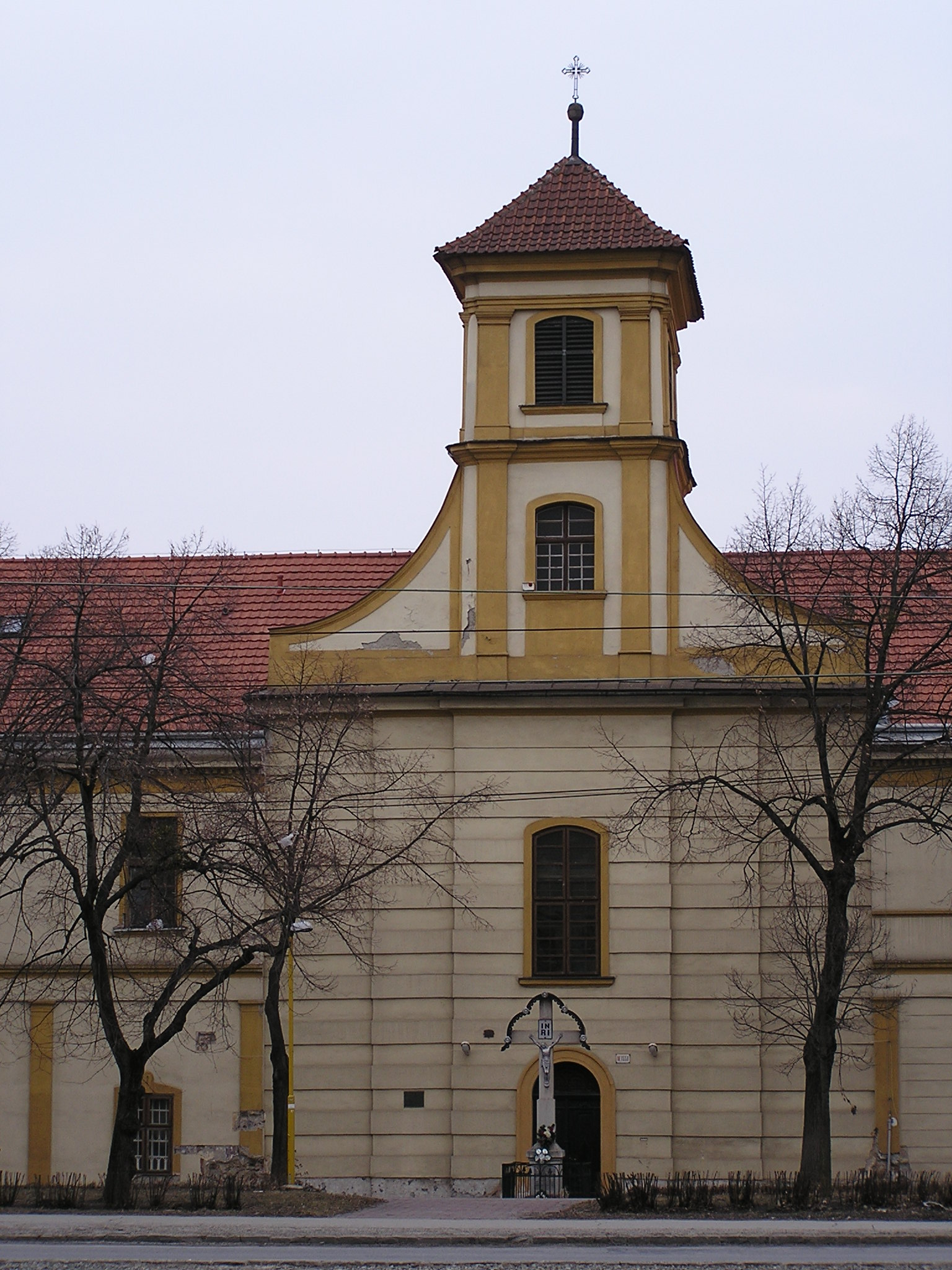
Church square

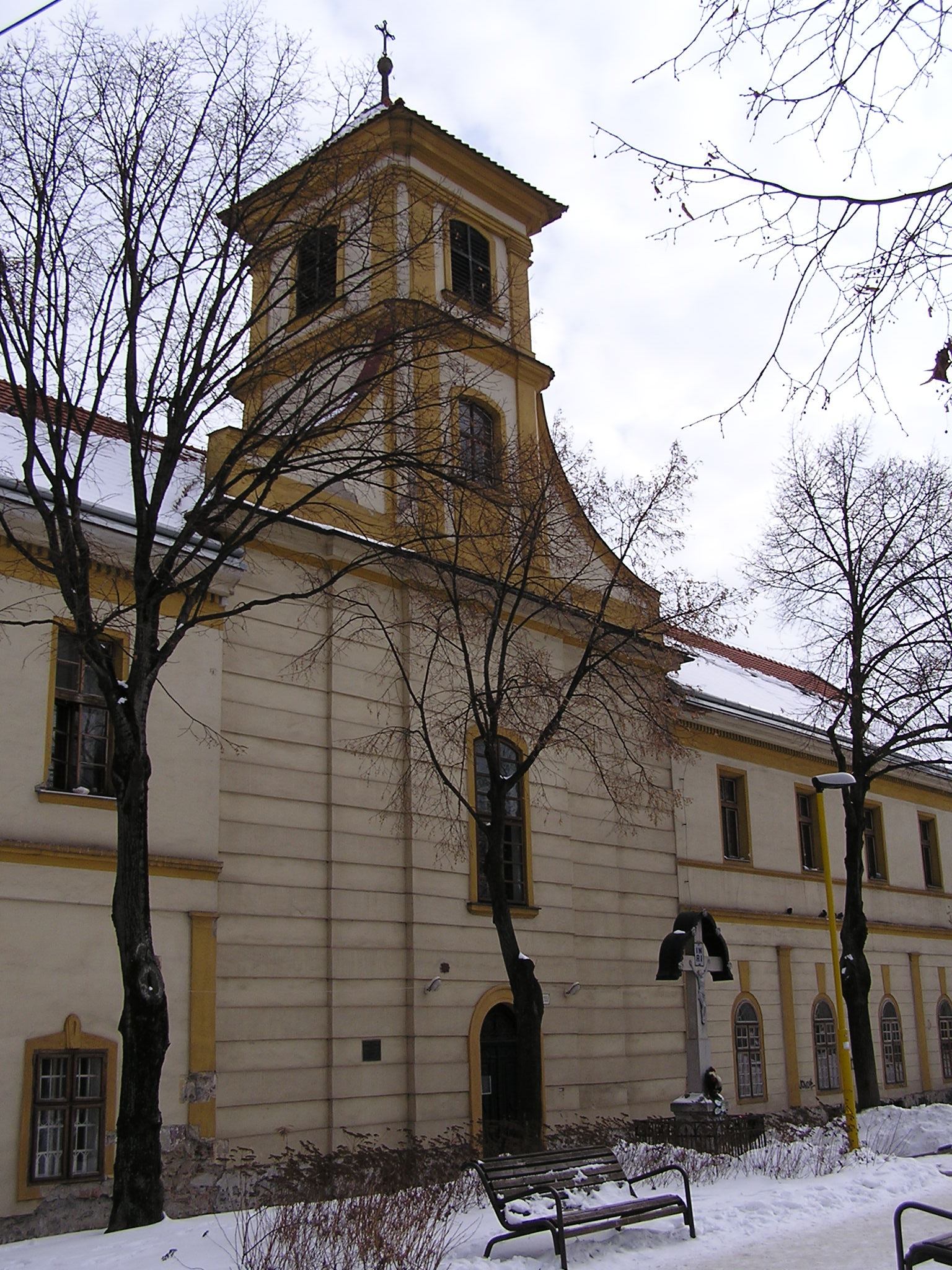
Front entrance

== See also ==
- Košice
