= Krásna =

Coordinates: 48°40′21″N 21°19′08″E

- Borough
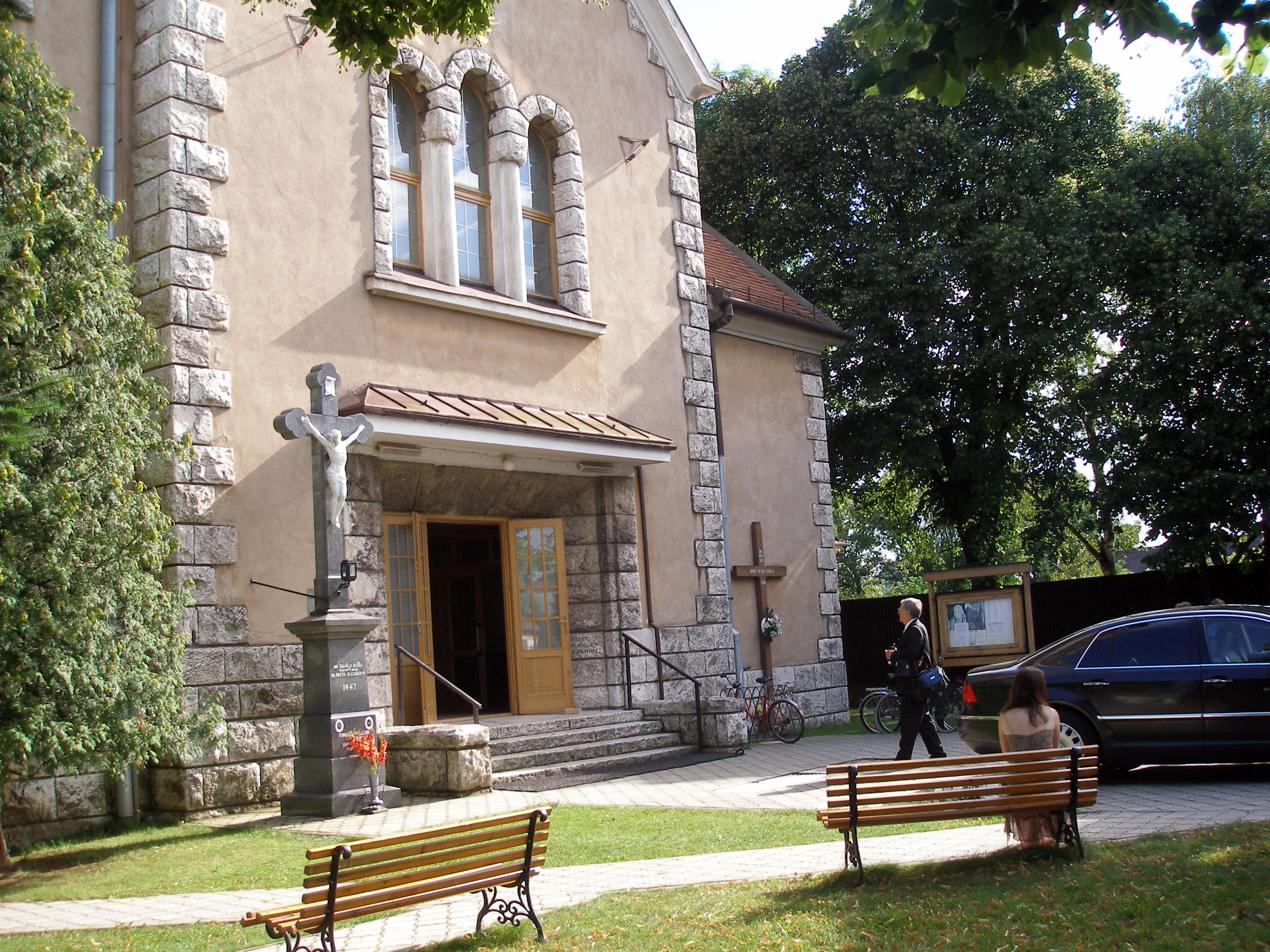
- Park in front of the church in Krásna

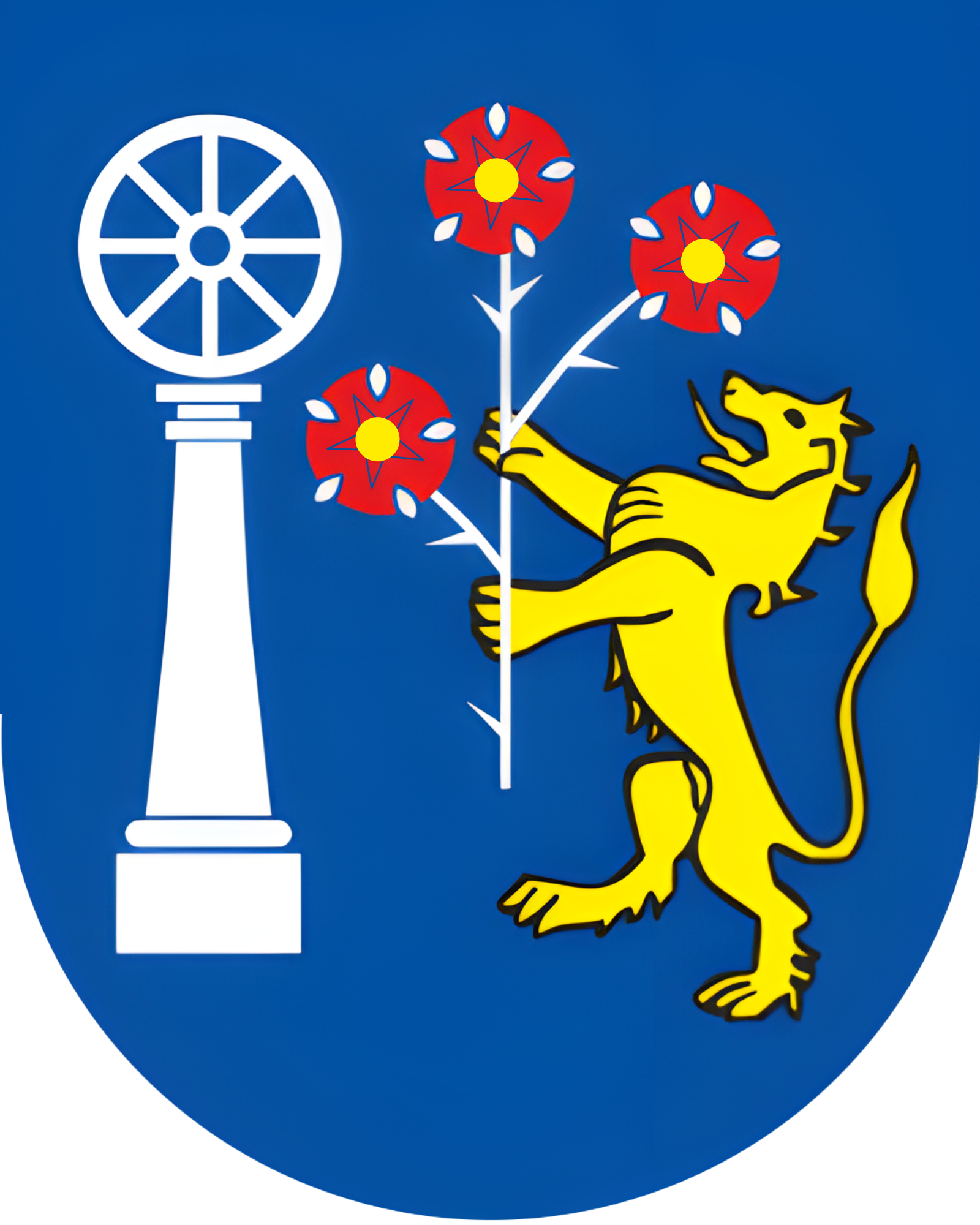
- Flag Coat of arms

- Location within Košice

- Location of Krásna in Slovakia
- Country: Slovakia
- Region: Košice
- District: Košice IV
- Village: 1143 (first known record)
- Borough: 1945

Area
  - Total: 20.10 km^{2} (7.76 sq mi)
- Elevation: 187 m (614 ft)

Population (2025)
  - Total: 6,396
- Time zone: UTC+1 (CET)
  - Summer (DST): UTC+2 (CEST)
- Postal code: 040 18
- Area code: +421-55
- Vehicle registration plate (until 2022): KE
- Website: www.kosicekrasna.sk

Krásna (literally: "beautiful" in English, Hungarian: Abaszéplak) is a borough (city ward) of the city of Košice, Slovakia. Located in the Košice IV district, it lies at an altitude of roughly 192 metres (630 ft) above sea level, and is home to over 5,000 people. Despite new small-scale housing developments, it retains much of its rural character.

== History ==
The first written record of Krásna dates back to 1143. It was an independent village municipality until 1945, when it was connected with Košice.

In the past, it was also known under the municipal name Krásna nad Hornádom ("Krásna-upon-Hornád").

=== Evolution of the borough's name ===
Some of the recorded historical names of Krásna.

- 1219 - abbas de Zebloc (Latin)
- 1255 - Sceplok
- 1280 - monast. Zceplak
- 1288 - villa Zeplak
- 1327 - poss. Zyplok
- 1328 - Zeplak
- 1335 - poss. Sceplok, Sceplak
- 1337 - Zeplak
- 1808 - Szýplak (Hungarian)
- 1906 - Siplak
- 1918 - Krásna nad Hornádom (Slovak)

== Statistics ==
- Area: 20.05 square kilometres (7.74 sq mi)
- Population: 5,401 (31 December 2017)
- Density of population: 270/km^{2} (31 December 2017)
- District: Košice IV
- Mayor: Peter Tomko (as of 2018 elections)

== Geography ==
The municipality lies at an altitude of 187 metres (614 ft) and covers an area of 20.10 km^{2} (7.76 sq mi) (2025).

== Population ==
Population statistic (10 years)
Year	1995	2005	2015	2025
Count	0	3615	5051	6396
Difference		–	+39.72%	+26.62%

Population statistic
Year	2024	2025
Count	6282	6396
Difference		+1.81%

It has a population of 6396 people (31 December 2025).

=== Ethnicity ===
Census 2021 (1+ %)
Ethnicity	Number	Fraction
Slovak	4842	82.13%
Not found out	766	12.99%
Romani	201	3.4%
Hungarian	116	1.96%
Total	5895	

In year 2021 was 5895 people by ethnicity 4842 as Slovak, 766 as Not found out, 201 as Romani, 116 as Hungarian, 54 as Rusyn, 31 as Czech, 26 as Other, 25 as Ukrainian, 22 as Chinese, 13 as Vietnamese, 13 as German, 11 as Russian, 6 as Polish, 3 as Canadian, 3 as Albanian, 2 as Austrian, 1 as Jewish, 1 as Italian, 1 as Moravian, 1 as French and 1 as English.

Note on population: The difference values of population numbers in the table "Population statistic" and in the sections "Ethnicity" & "Religion" is caused by the use of various statistical methods.

=== Religion ===
Census 2021 (1+ %)
Religion	Number	Fraction
Roman Catholic Church	3151	53.45%
None	1237	20.98%
Not found out	769	13.04%
Greek Catholic Church	310	5.26%
Calvinist Church	121	2.05%
Evangelical Church	108	1.83%
Total	5895	

In year 2021 was 5895 people by religion 3151 from Roman Catholic Church, 1237 from None, 769 from Not found out, 310 from Greek Catholic Church, 121 from Calvinist Church, 108 from Evangelical Church, 38 from Other and not ascertained christian church, 33 from Eastern Orthodox Church, 21 from Other, 20 from Baptists Church, 18 from Jehovah's Witnesses, 15 from Buddhism, 14 from Apostolic Church, 14 from Ad hoc movements, 9 from Christian Congregations in Slovakia, 6 from Paganism and natural spirituality, 5 from Islam, 2 from Seventh-day Adventist Church, 1 from Jewish community, 1 from Hinduism, 1 from United Methodist Church and 1 from Church of Jesus Christ of Latter-day Saints.

== Gallery ==
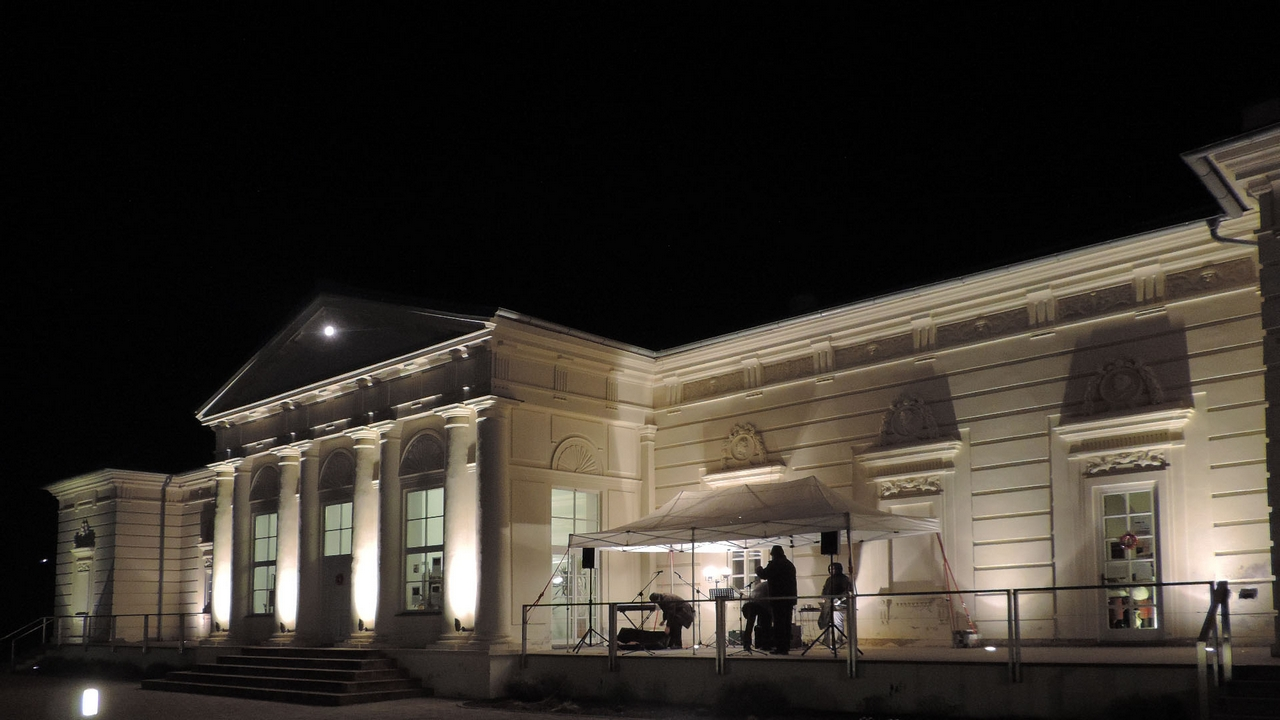
Meško manor house post-reconstruction, at night time (August 2015)

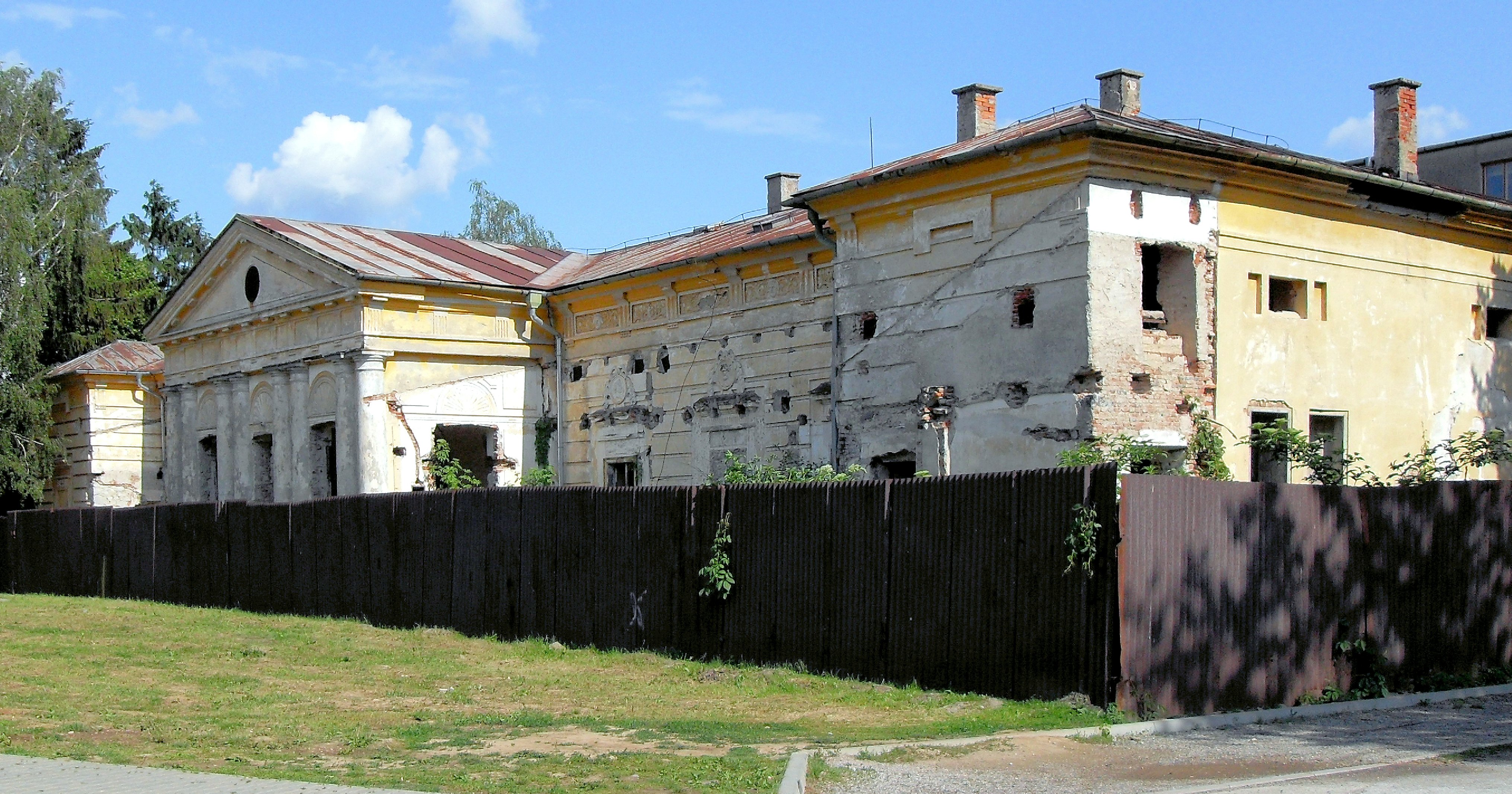
Meško manor house in Krásna borough, before reconstruction (May 2012)

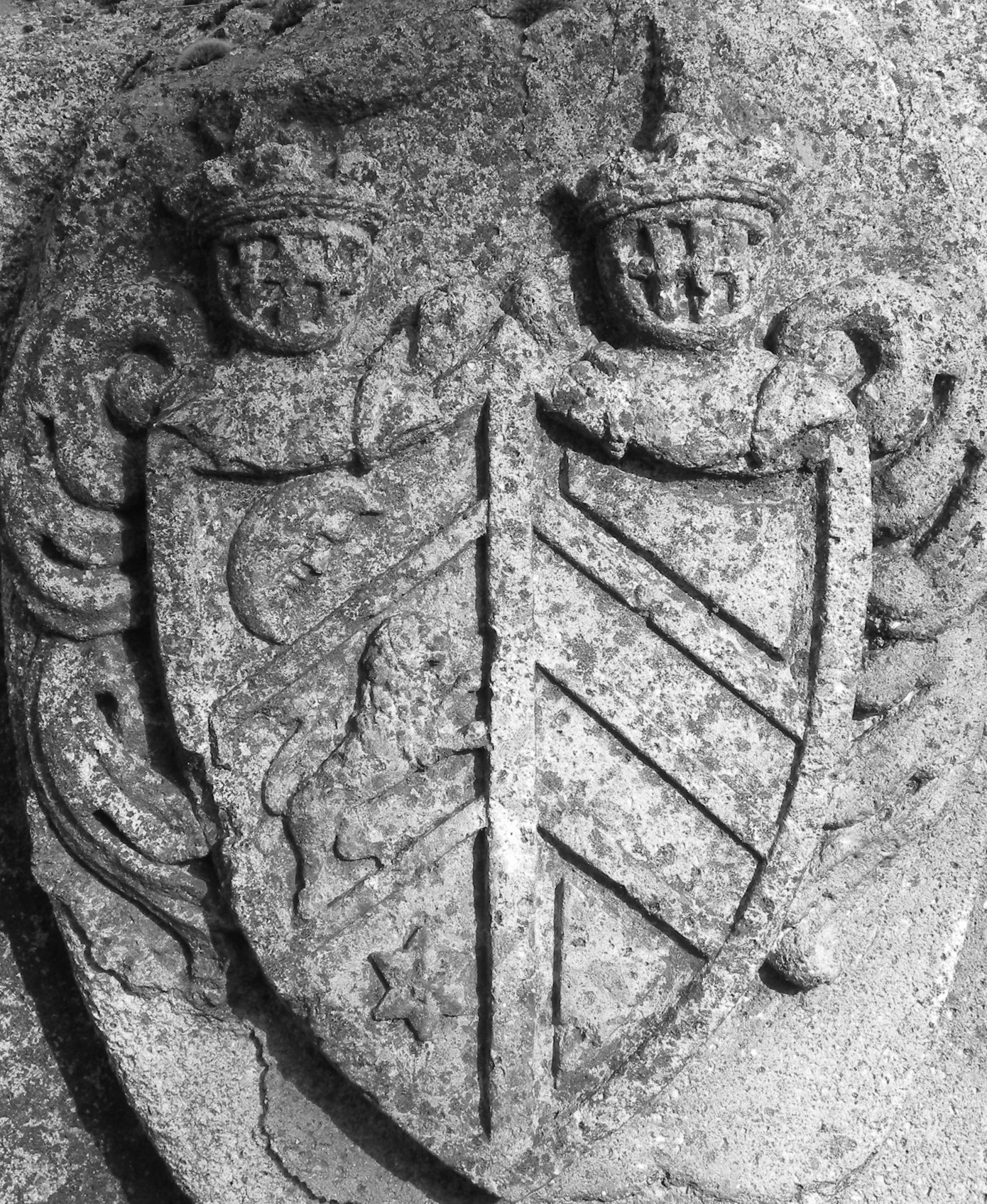
Coat of arms of József Mesko de Széplak, former owner of the manor house, tomb at Krásna cemetery

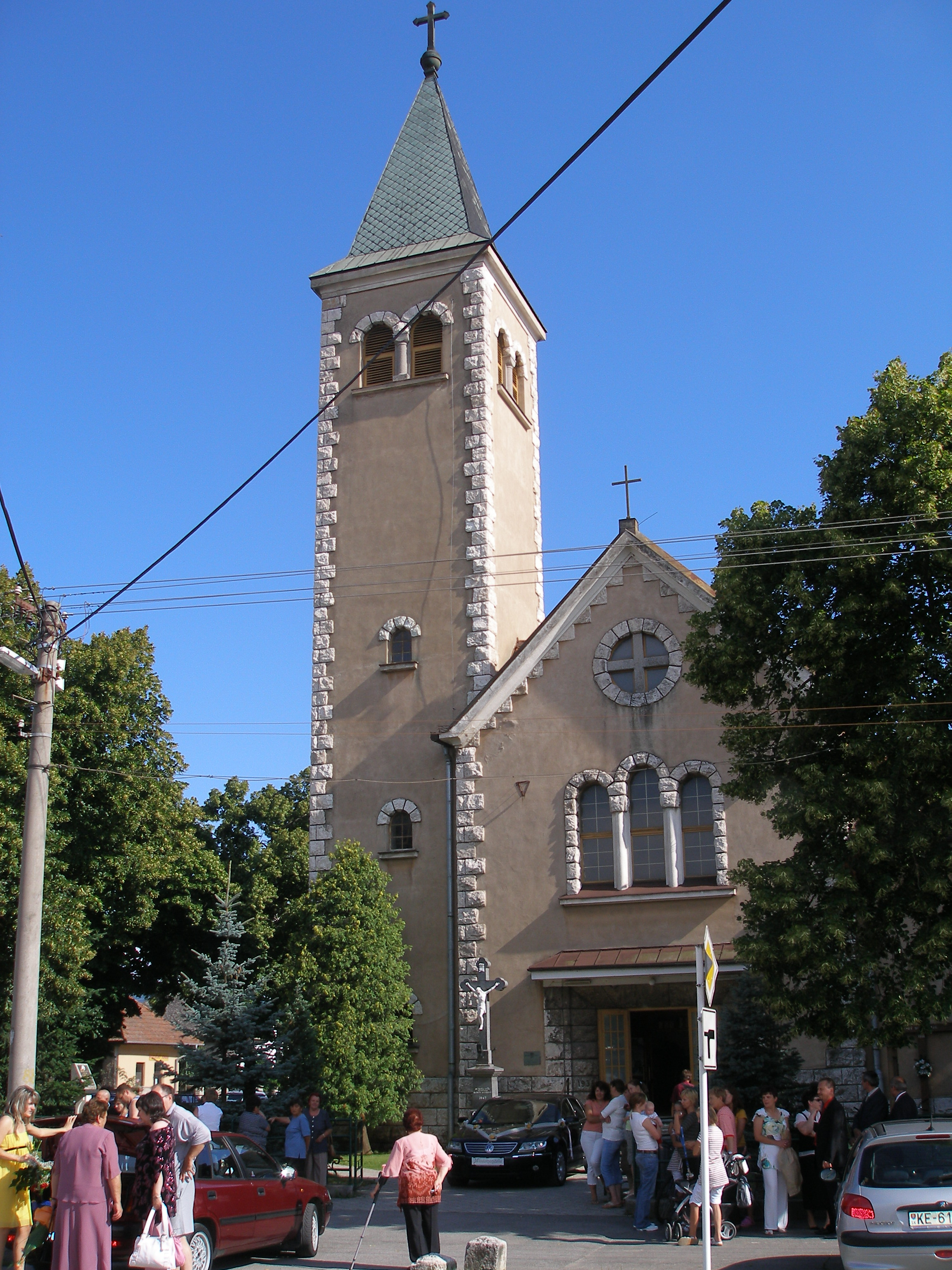
Church of St Cyril and St Methodius in the Krásna borough

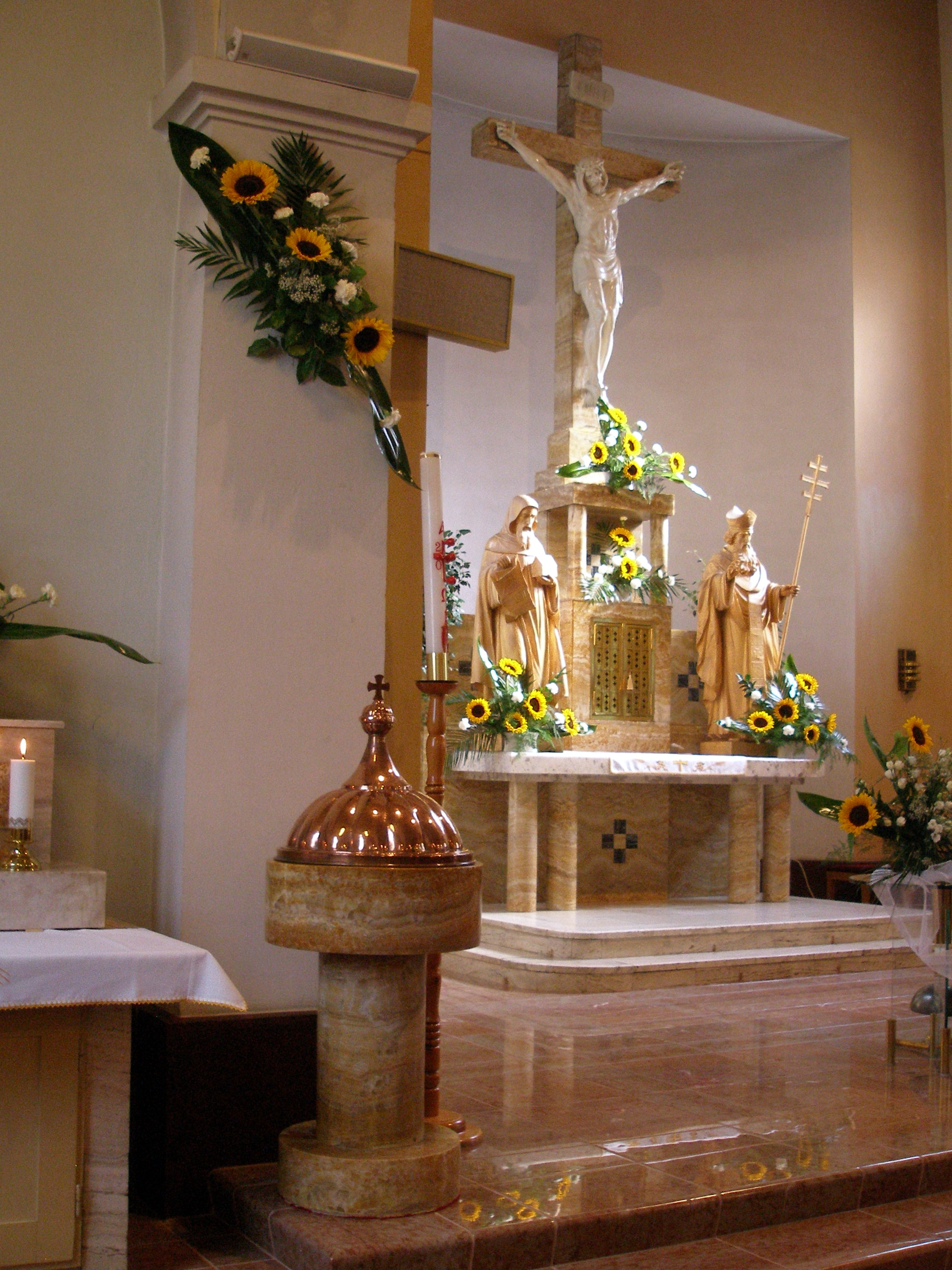
Interior and altar of the St Cyril and St Methodius church

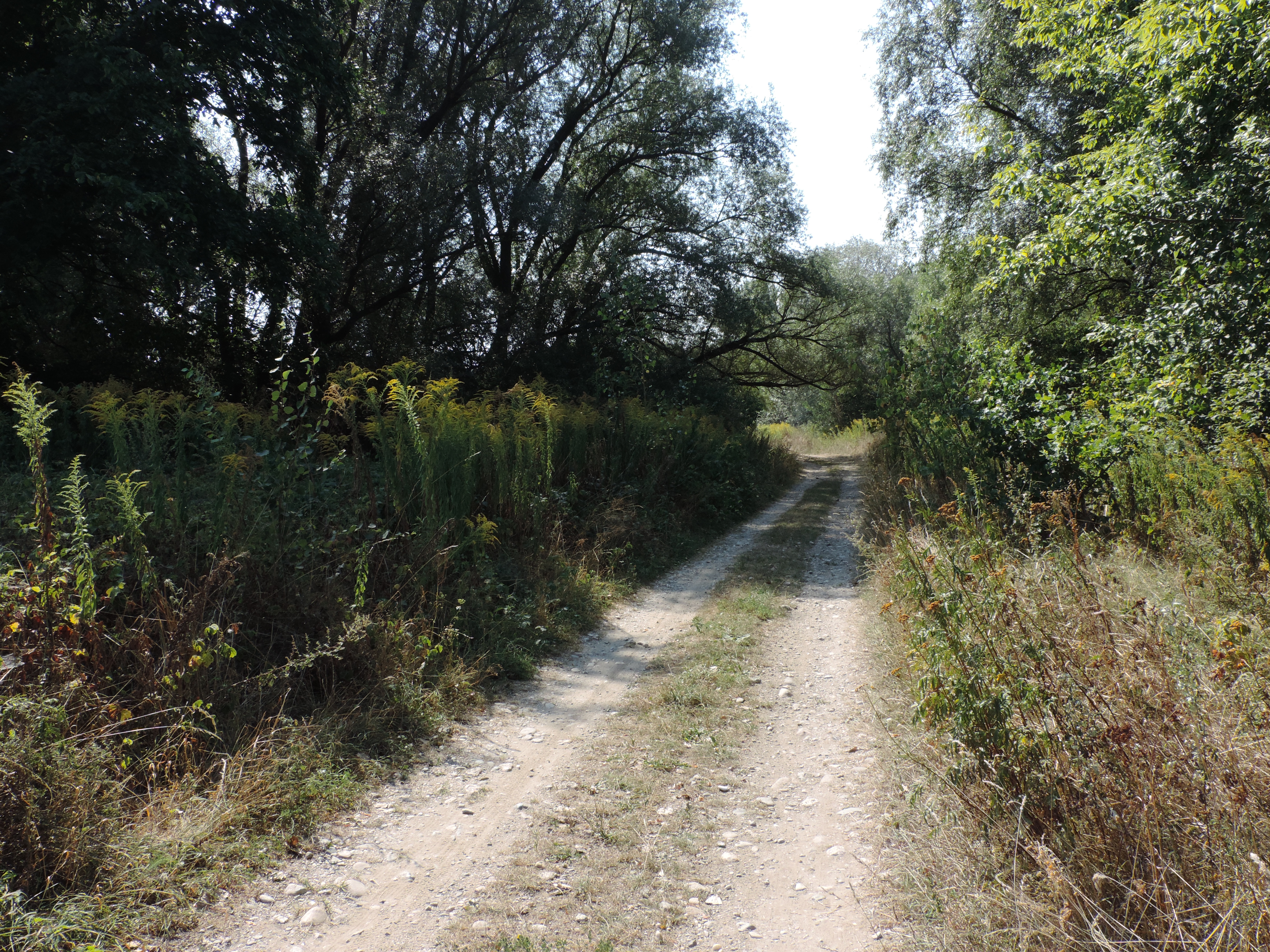
Tourist cycling trail in the countryside around Krásna

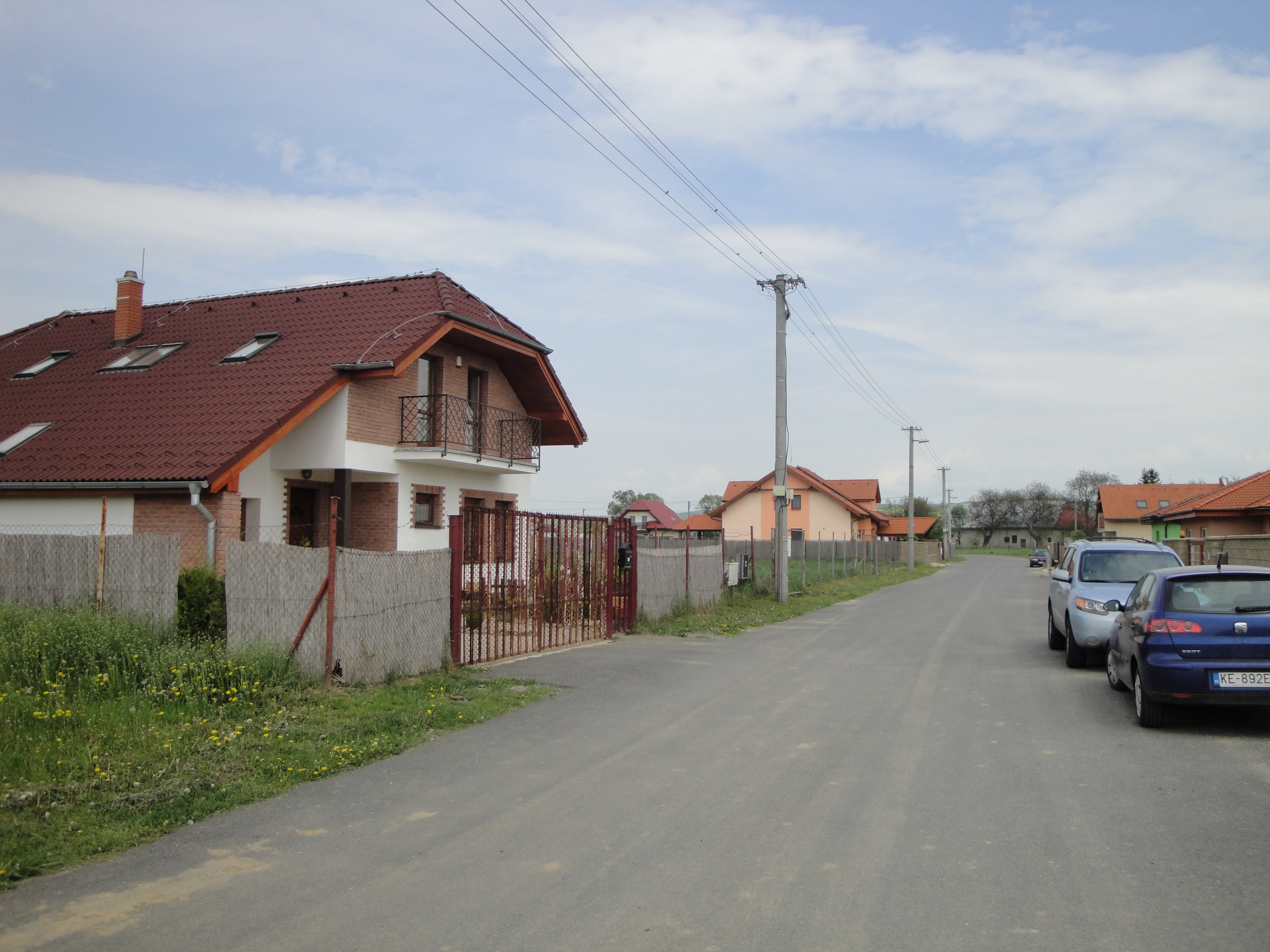
New housing development in Krásna

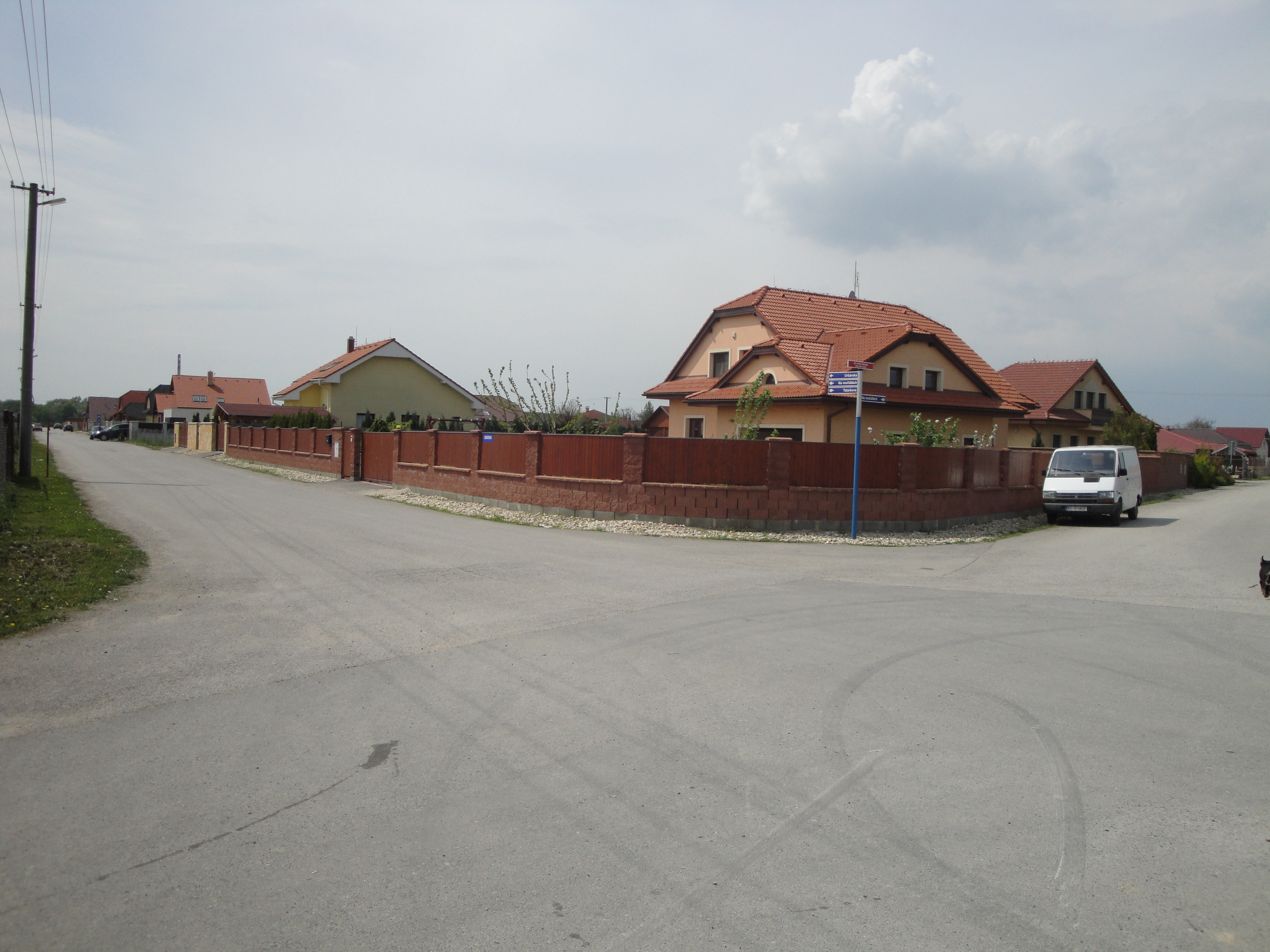
New housing development in Krásna
