= Košice-Juh =

Coordinates: 48°42′33″N 21°15′25″E

Košice-South Košice-Juh
- Borough
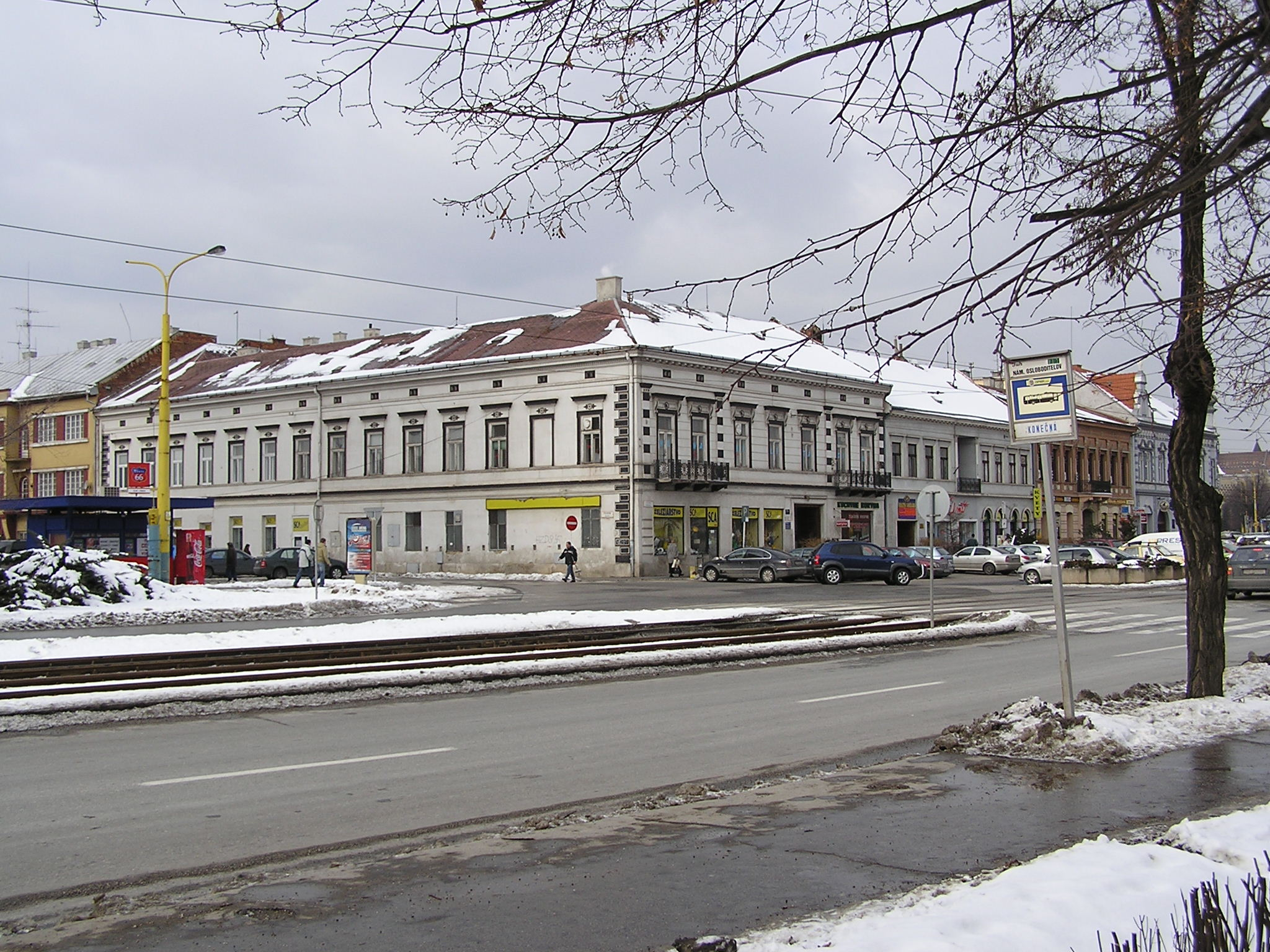
- Košice-Juh

- Flag Coat of arms

- Location within Košice

- Location of Košice-Juh in Slovakia
- Country: Slovakia
- Region: Košice
- District: Košice IV

Area
  - Total: 9.74 km^{2} (3.76 sq mi)
- Elevation: 200 m (660 ft)

Population (2025)
  - Total: 20,442
- Time zone: UTC+1 (CET)
  - Summer (DST): UTC+2 (CEST)
- Postal code: 040 11
- Area code: +421-55
- Vehicle registration plate (until 2022): KE
- Website: www.kosicejuh.sk

Košice-Juh (literally: Košice-South; Hungarian: Kassa-Dél) is a borough (city ward) of the city of Košice, Slovakia. Located in the Košice IV district, in the southern area of the city, it lies at an altitude of roughly 200 metres (660 ft) above sea level.

== Historical landmarks ==
The oldest building in the borough is the Holy Spirit Church, erected in 1733.

== Statistics ==
- Area: 9.77 square kilometres (3.77 sq mi)
- Population: 23,030 (31 December 2017)
- Density of population: 2,400/km^{2} (31 December 2017)
- District: Košice IV
- Mayor: Jaroslav Hlinka (as of 2018 elections)

== Geography ==
The municipality lies at an altitude of 200 metres (660 ft) and covers an area of 9.74 km^{2} (3.76 sq mi) (2025).

== Population ==
Population statistic (10 years)
Year	1995	2005	2015	2025
Count	0	22,717	22,972	20,442
Difference		–	+1.12%	−11.01%

Population statistic
Year	2024	2025
Count	20,599	20,442
Difference		−0.76%

It has a population of 20,442 people (31 December 2025).

=== Ethnicity ===
Census 2021 (1+ %)
Ethnicity	Number	Fraction
Slovak	18,053	84.6%
Not found out	2150	10.07%
Hungarian	1124	5.26%
Rusyn	384	1.79%
Czech	243	1.13%
Total	21,339	

In year 2021 was 21,339 people by ethnicity 18,053 as Slovak, 2150 as Not found out, 1124 as Hungarian, 384 as Rusyn, 243 as Czech, 186 as Romani, 122 as Other, 98 as Ukrainian, 68 as German, 43 as Russian, 23 as Jewish, 17 as Vietnamese, 16 as Polish, 15 as French, 13 as Italian, 10 as English, 6 as Irish, 6 as Moravian, 5 as Canadian, 5 as Bulgarian, 5 as Albanian, 4 as Turkish, 4 as Austrian, 3 as Silesian, 2 as Serbian, 2 as Romanian, 2 as Iranian, 2 as Greek and 1 as Croatian.

Note on population: The difference values of population numbers in the table "Population statistic" and in the sections "Ethnicity" & "Religion" is caused by the use of various statistical methods.

=== Religion ===
Census 2021 (1+ %)
Religion	Number	Fraction
Roman Catholic Church	9269	43.44%
None	6249	29.28%
Not found out	2290	10.73%
Greek Catholic Church	1463	6.86%
Evangelical Church	737	3.45%
Calvinist Church	539	2.53%
Eastern Orthodox Church	229	1.07%
Total	21,339	

In year 2021 was 21,339 people by religion 9269 from Roman Catholic Church, 6249 from None, 2290 from Not found out, 1463 from Greek Catholic Church, 737 from Evangelical Church, 539 from Calvinist Church, 229 from Eastern Orthodox Church, 115 from Jehovah's Witnesses, 83 from Ad hoc movements, 76 from Other, 53 from Other and not ascertained christian church, 49 from Jewish community, 36 from Buddhism, 30 from Apostolic Church, 28 from Christian Congregations in Slovakia, 18 from Islam, 18 from Seventh-day Adventist Church, 11 from United Methodist Church, 10 from Paganism and natural spirituality, 9 from Baptists Church, 8 from Church of the Brethren, 6 from Old Catholic Church, 6 from Czechoslovak Hussite Church, 4 from Hinduism, 1 from New Apostolic Church, 1 from Church of Jesus Christ of Latter-day Saints and 1 from Bahá'i Community.

== Gallery ==
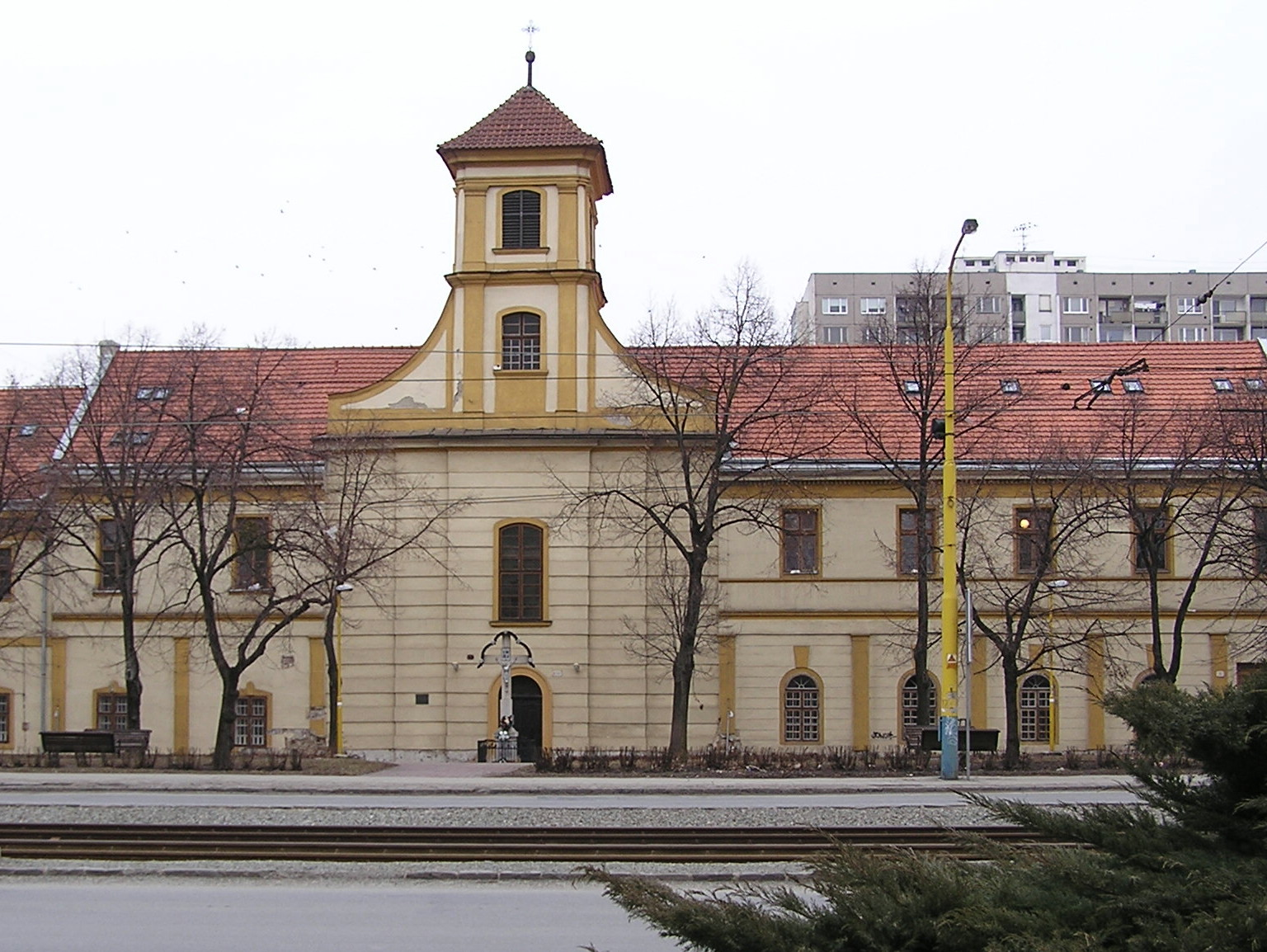
18th century Holy Spirit Church, the oldest building in the borough

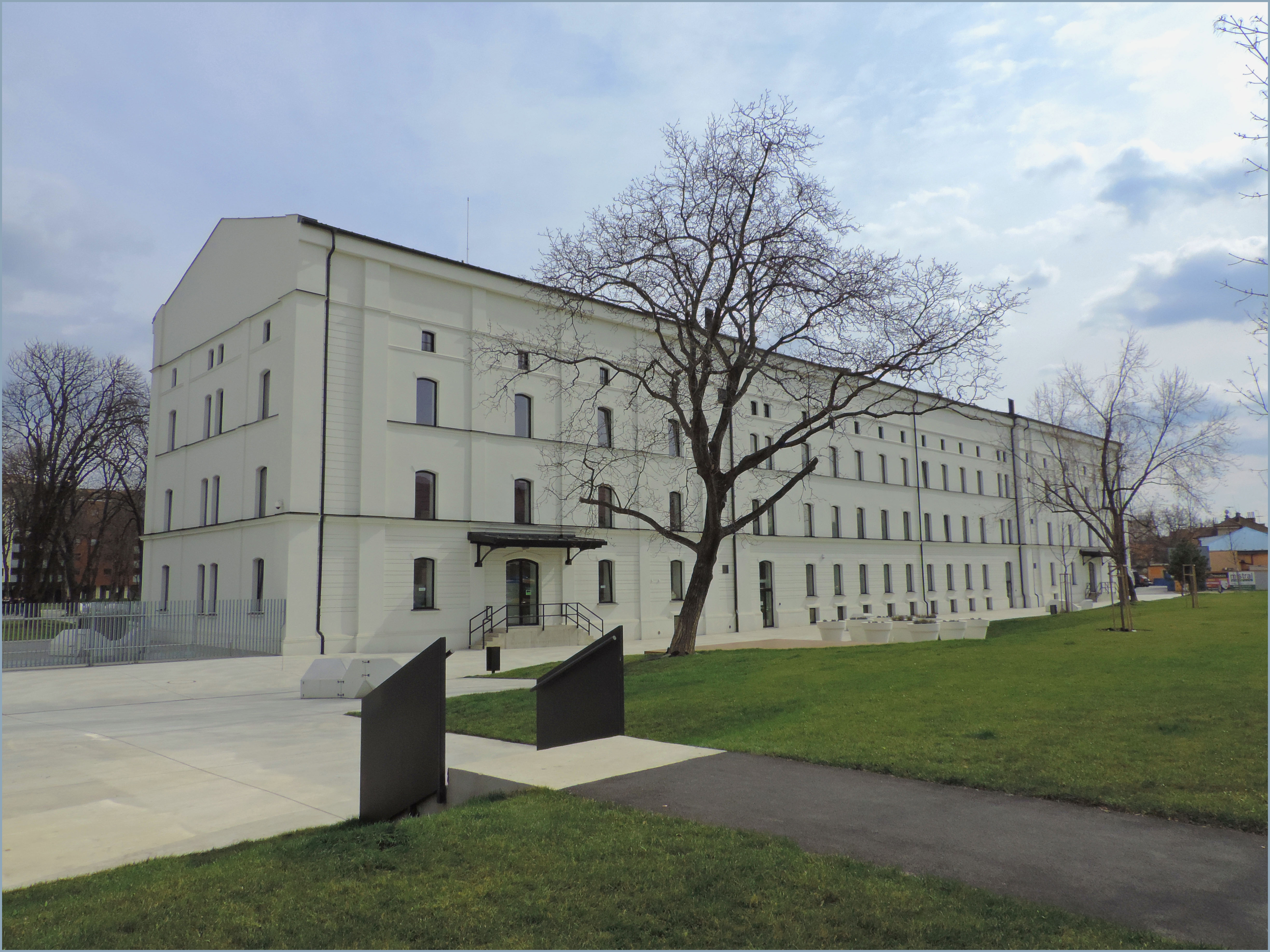
Kasárne-Kulturpark (Art and culture centre converted from historical barracks)

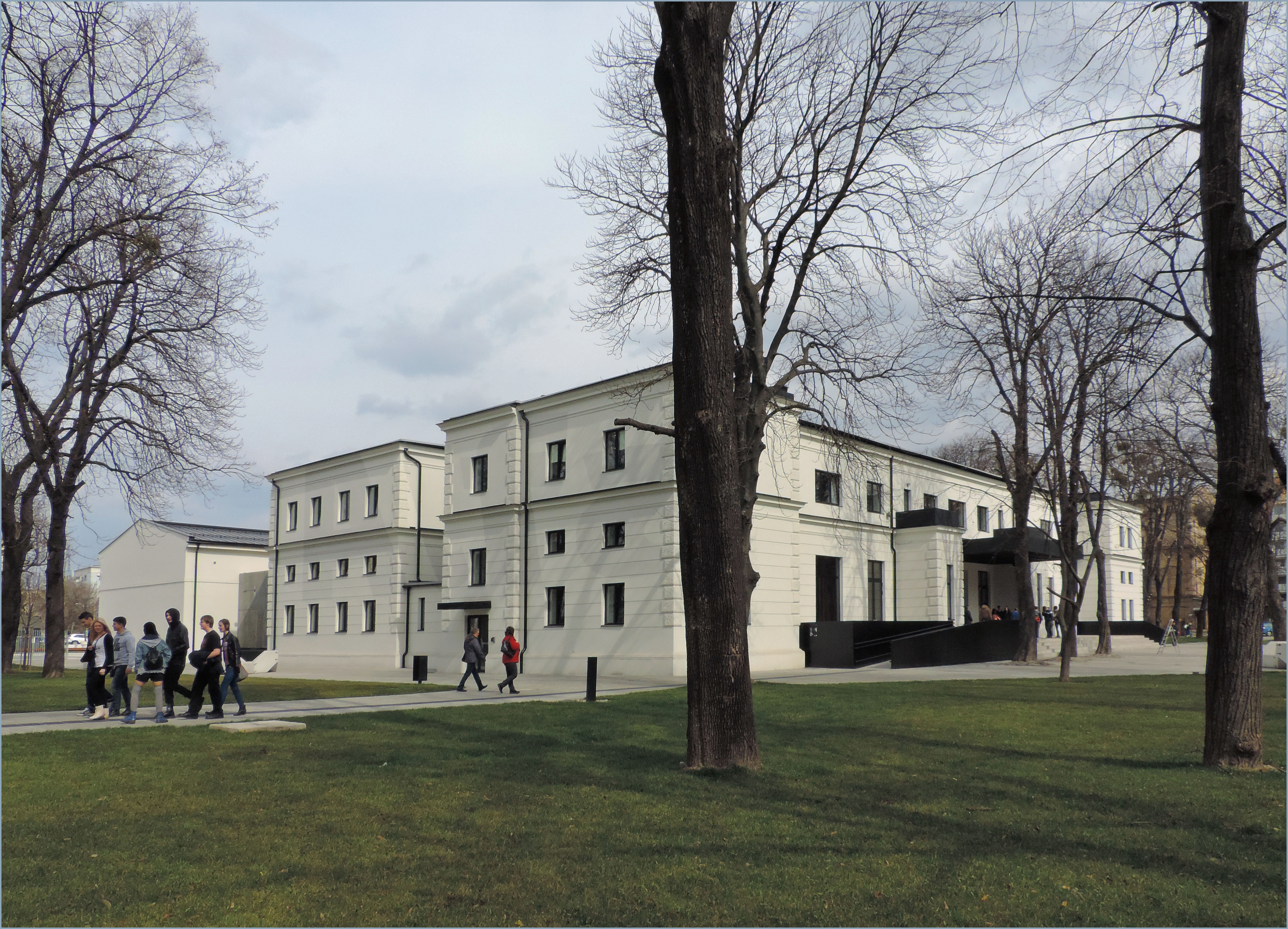
Kasárne-Kulturpark (Art and culture centre converted from historical barracks)

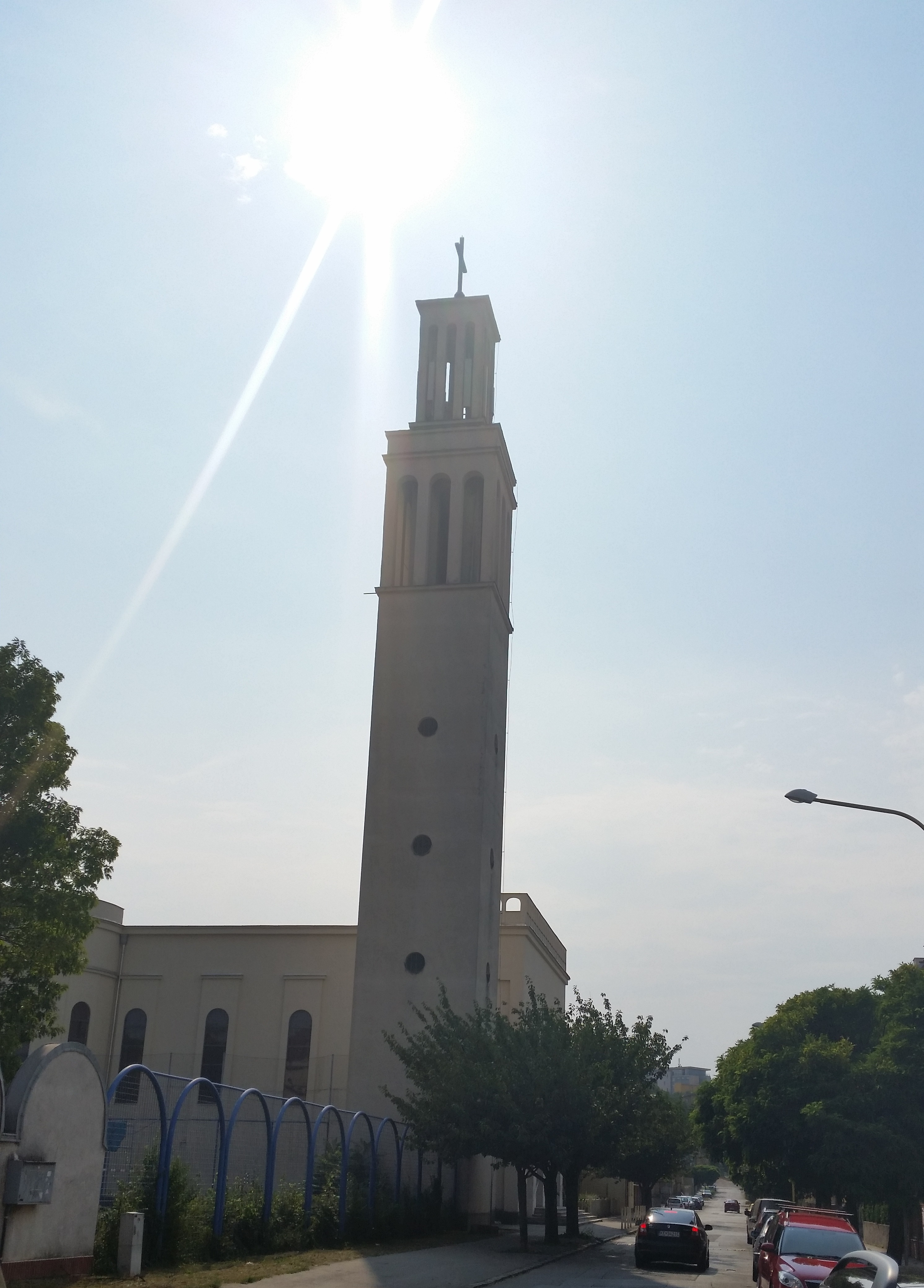
Local church in the Košice-Juh borough

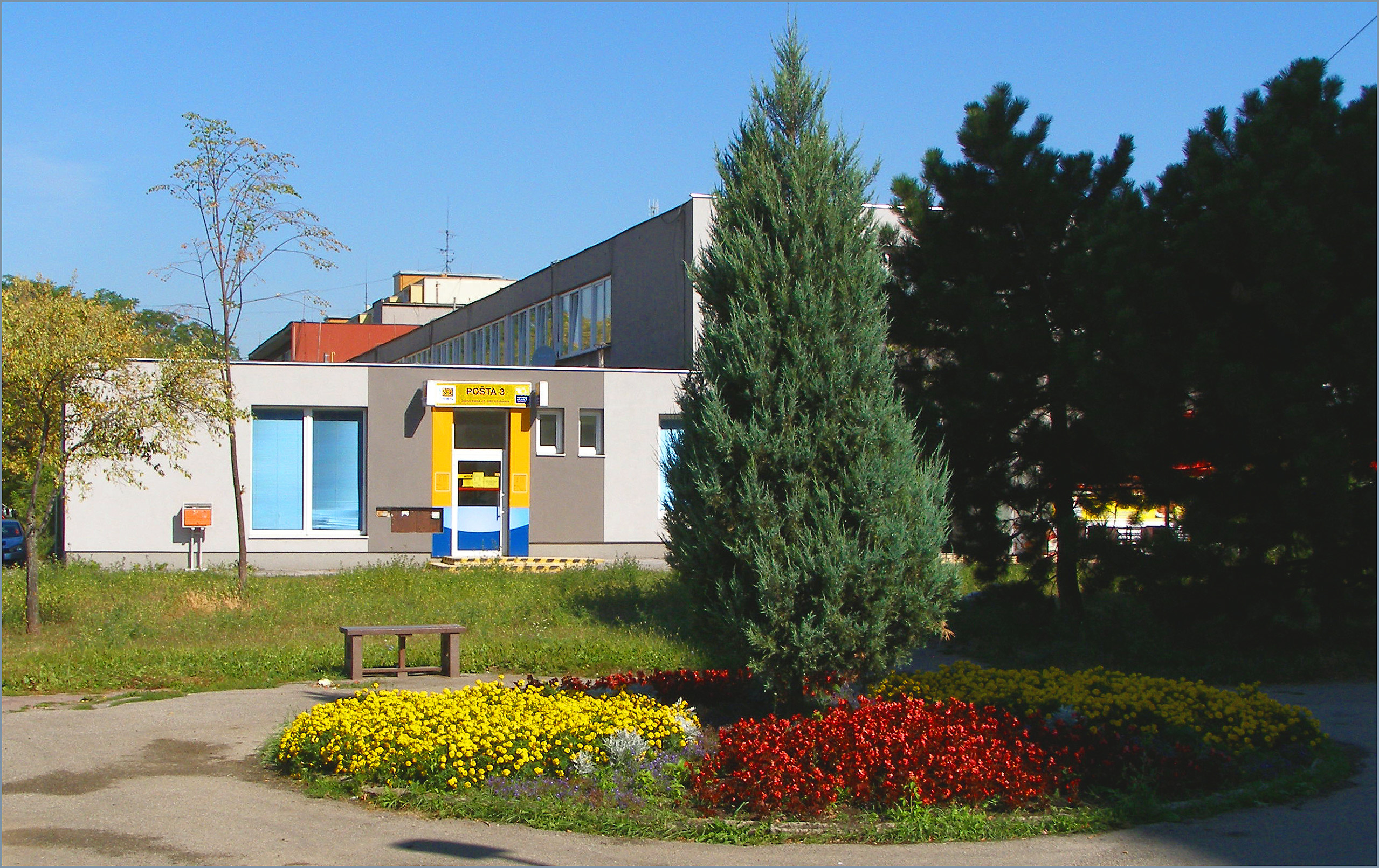
Local post office in the Košice-Juh borough

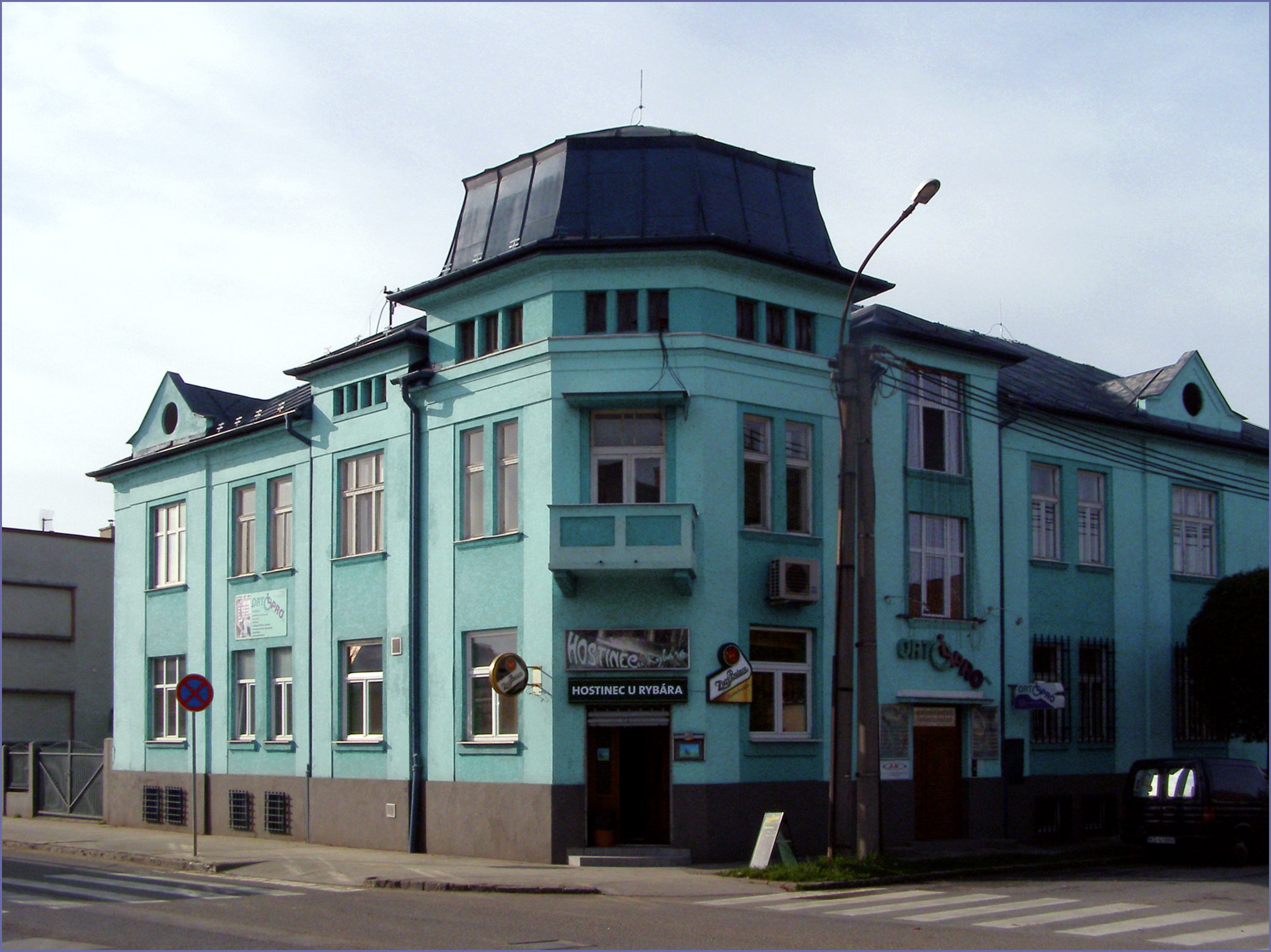
Inn in an older building at the corner of a street

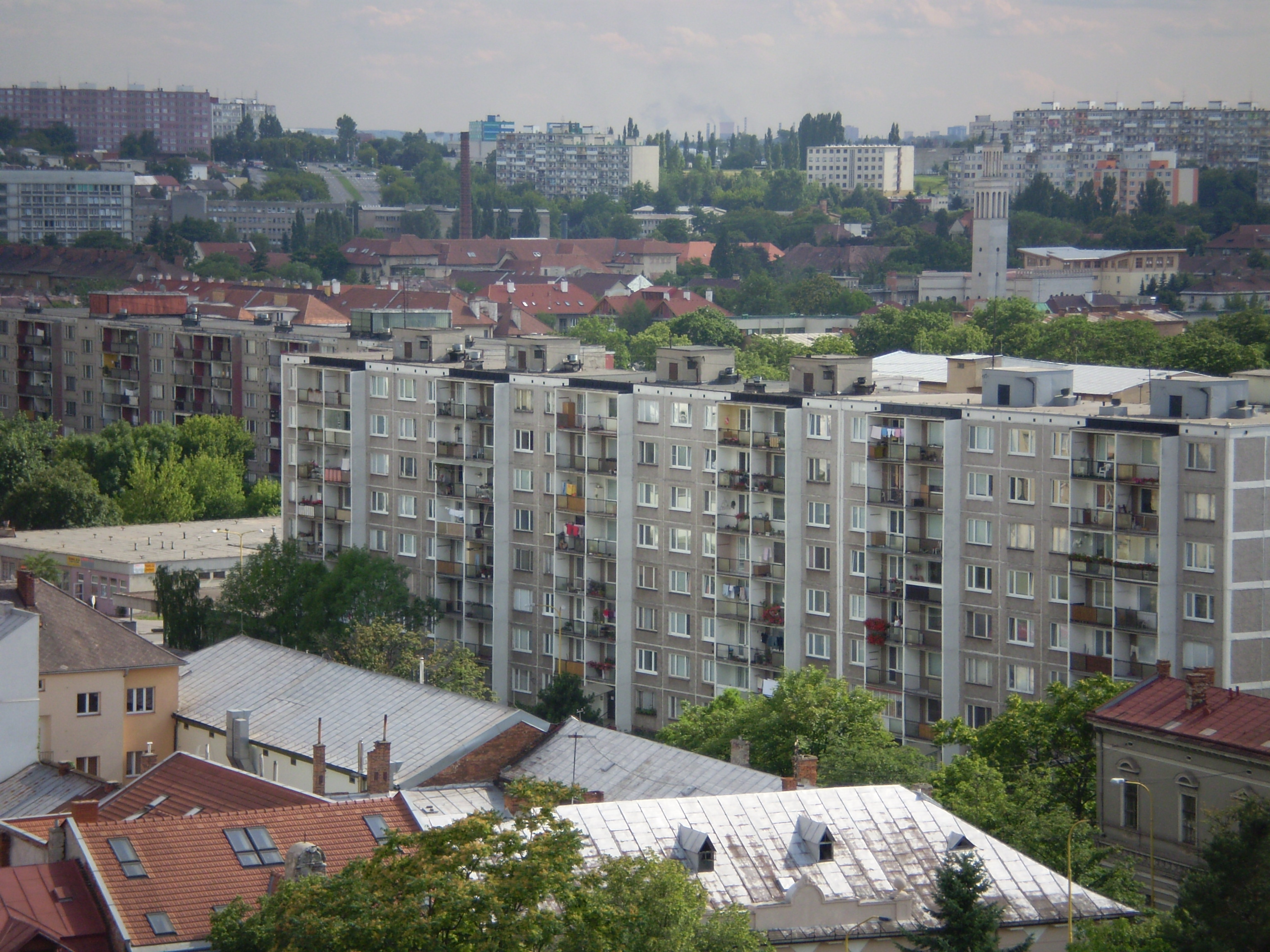
Apartment blocks at a Košice-Juh housing estate

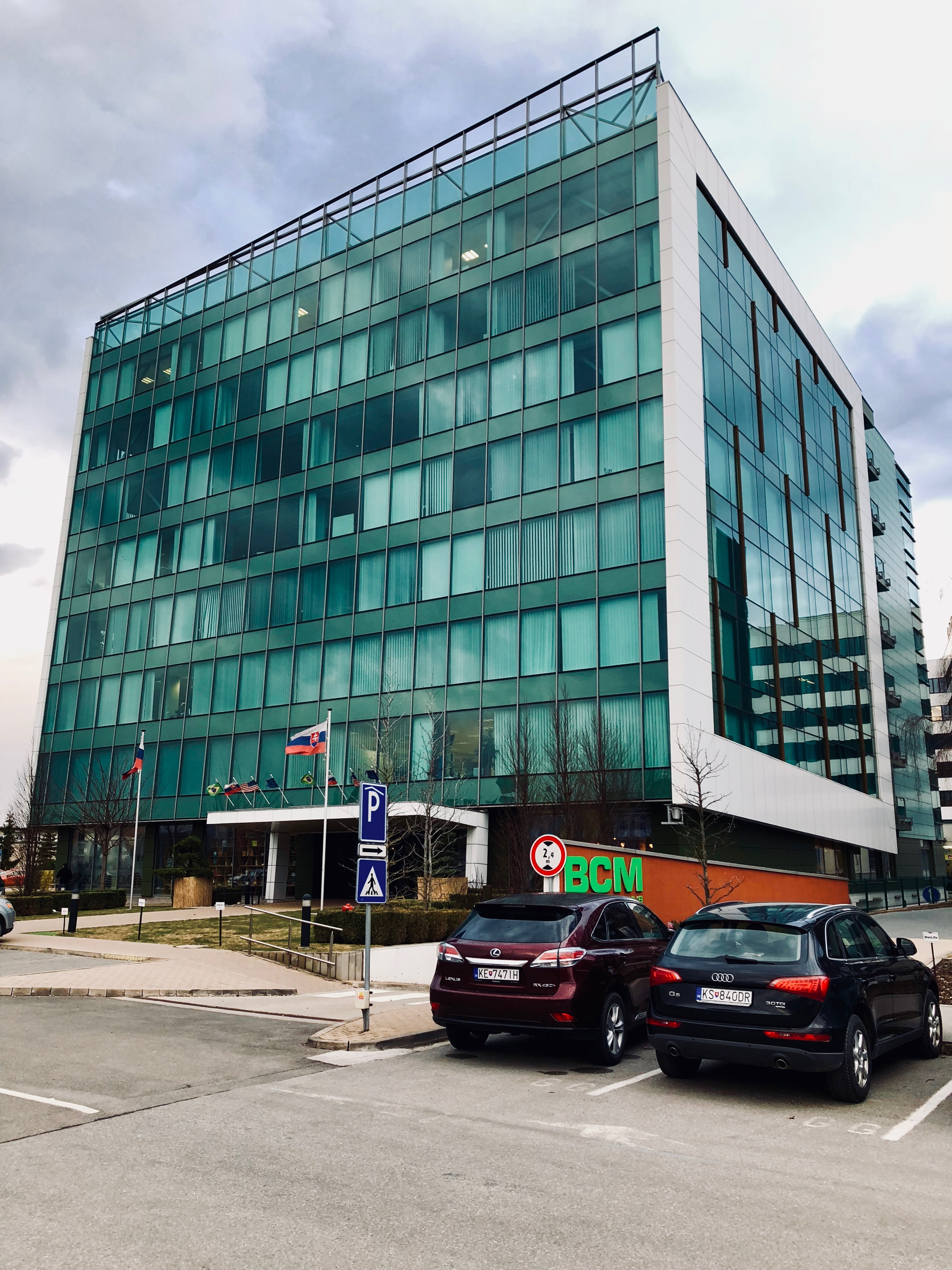
Business center Moldavská

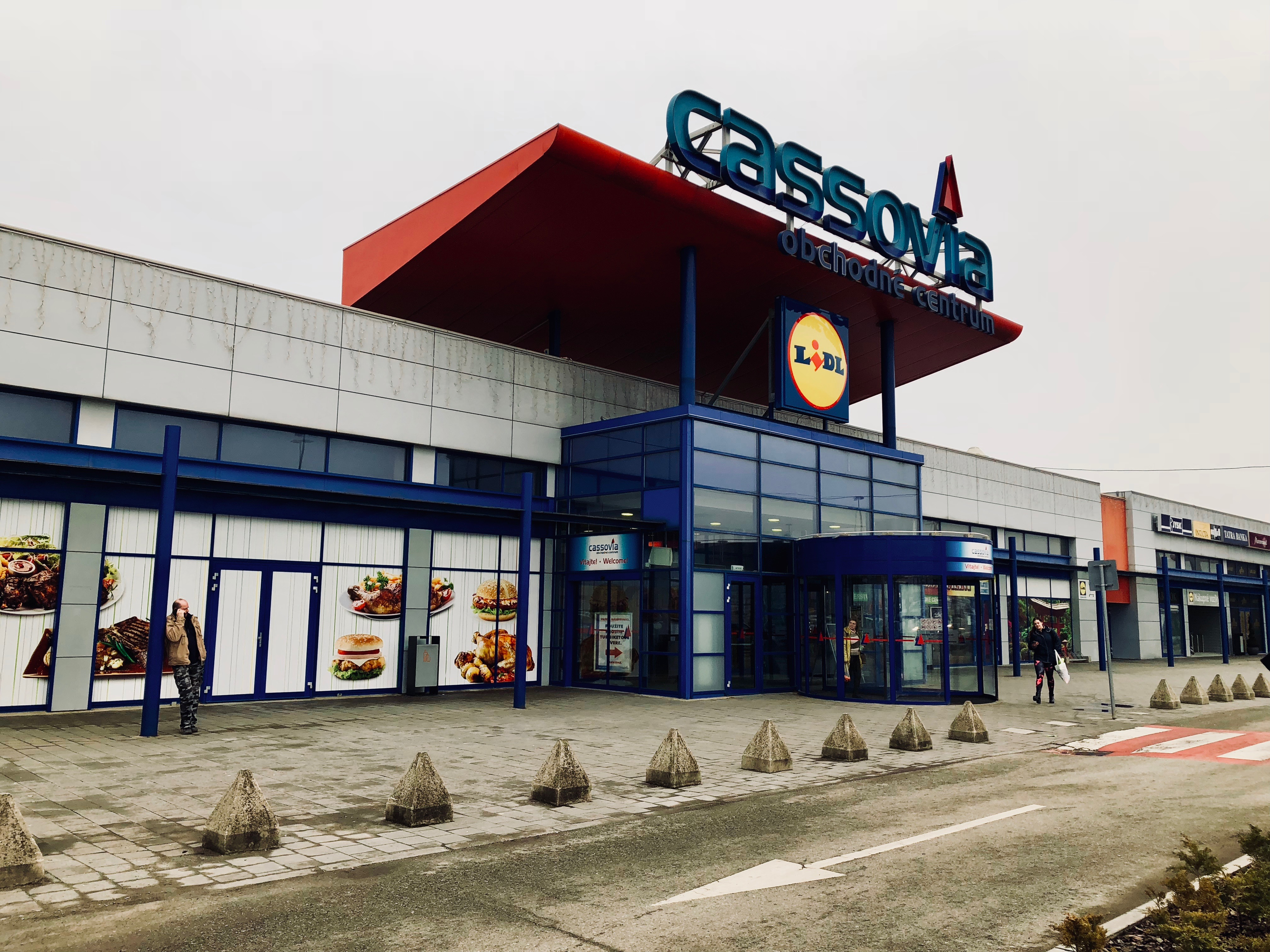
Cassovia Shopping Center

== Climate ==
Climate data for Kosice
Month	Jan	Feb	Mar	Apr	May	Jun	Jul	Aug	Sep	Oct	Nov	Dec	Year
Mean daily maximum °C (°F)	−1 (31)	2 (36)	8 (47)	14 (57)	19 (66)	22 (71)	24 (75)	23 (74)	19 (67)	13 (56)	5 (41)	1 (33)	13 (55)
Mean daily minimum °C (°F)	−5 (23)	−3 (26)	1 (33)	5 (41)	9 (49)	12 (54)	14 (57)	13 (56)	10 (50)	6 (42)	0 (32)	−3 (26)	5 (41)
Average precipitation mm (inches)	28 (1.1)	30 (1.2)	30 (1.2)	36 (1.4)	66 (2.6)	86 (3.4)	86 (3.4)	79 (3.1)	51 (2)	36 (1.4)	46 (1.8)	38 (1.5)	620 (24.3)
Source: Weatherbase
