= Šebastovce =

Coordinates: 48°39′N 21°16′E

- Borough
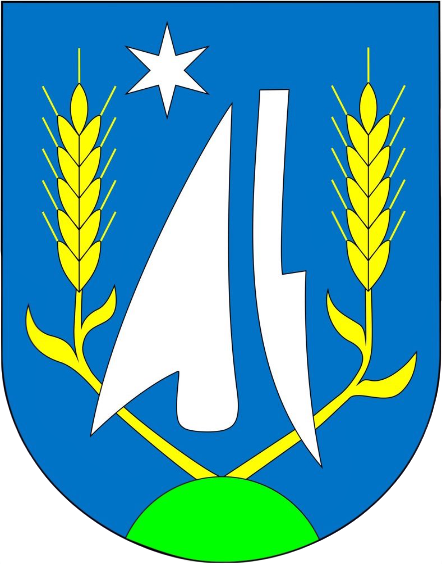
- Flag Coat of arms

- Location within Košice

- Location of Šebastovce in Slovakia
- Country: Slovakia
- Region: Košice
- District: Košice IV
- Village: 1248 (first known record)

Area
  - Total: 4.44 km^{2} (1.71 sq mi)
- Elevation: 208 m (682 ft)

Population (2025)
  - Total: 787
- Time zone: UTC+1 (CET)
  - Summer (DST): UTC+2 (CEST)
- Postal code: 040 17
- Area code: +421-55
- Vehicle registration plate (until 2022): KE
- Website: www.sebastovce.sk

Šebastovce (Hungarian: Zsebes) is a borough (city ward) of Košice, Slovakia. Located in the Košice IV district, it lies at an altitude of roughly 209 metres (686 ft) above sea level, and borders the boroughs of Barca and Poľov. Šebastovce has a mostly rural character, with a population of over 700 inhabitants. Along with Poľov and Šaca, it is the southernmost of Košice's 22 boroughs, and the southernmost of the Košice IV boroughs.

== History ==
The village of Šebastovce first appeared in written records in 1248.

In the 20th century, Šebastovce lost village municipality status and was annexed to Košice as one of its boroughs.

== Statistics ==
- Area: 5.1 square kilometres (2.0 sq mi)
- Population: 732 (31 December 2017)
- Density of population: 140/km^{2} (31 December 2017)
- District: Košice IV
- Mayor: Monika Puzderová (as of 2018 elections)

== Geography ==
The municipality lies at an altitude of 208 metres (682 ft) and covers an area of 4.44 km^{2} (1.71 sq mi) (2025).

== Population ==
Population statistic (10 years)
Year	1995	2005	2015	2025
Count	0	612	724	787
Difference		–	+18.30%	+8.70%

Population statistic
Year	2024	2025
Count	788	787
Difference		−0.12%

It has a population of 787 people (31 December 2025).

=== Ethnicity ===
Census 2021 (1+ %)
Ethnicity	Number	Fraction
Slovak	711	92.33%
Not found out	41	5.32%
Rusyn	11	1.42%
Total	770	

In year 2021 was 770 people by ethnicity 711 as Slovak, 41 as Not found out, 11 as Rusyn, 5 as Vietnamese, 5 as Hungarian, 4 as Czech, 2 as Russian, 2 as Austrian and 1 as Polish.

Note on population: The difference values of population numbers in the table "Population statistic" and in the sections "Ethnicity" & "Religion" is caused by the use of various statistical methods.

=== Religion ===
Census 2021 (1+ %)
Religion	Number	Fraction
Roman Catholic Church	504	65.45%
None	104	13.51%
Calvinist Church	46	5.97%
Not found out	46	5.97%
Greek Catholic Church	39	5.06%
Evangelical Church	22	2.86%
Total	770	

In year 2021 was 770 people by religion 504 from Roman Catholic Church, 104 from None, 46 from Calvinist Church, 46 from Not found out, 39 from Greek Catholic Church, 22 from Evangelical Church, 4 from Apostolic Church, 1 from Eastern Orthodox Church, 1 from Other and not ascertained christian church, 1 from Jehovah's Witnesses, 1 from Other and 1 from Ad hoc movements.
