= Boroughs and localities of Košice =

Košice, with districts differentiated by colour. District and borough borders in black.

Košice, the second largest city of Slovakia and largest city of east Slovakia, is divided into four national administrative districts (Slovak: okres): I, II, III, IV, and into 22 boroughs (Slovak: mestské časti; literally: city parts, also translated as (city) districts or wards). These boroughs vary in size and population, from the smallest Džungľa and least populated Lorinčík to the largest Košice-Sever and most populated Košice-Západ.

Each of the boroughs has its own mayor and council. The number of councillors in each depends on the size and population of that borough. Mayor and the local council are elected in municipal elections every four years. The boroughs are responsible for issues of local significance such as urban planning, local roads maintenance, budget, local ordinances, parks maintenance, safety and so on.

The following table gives an overview of the boroughs, along with the district, population, area, annexation, if applicable, and location within Košice.

Borough and district		Population	Area [km²]	Annexed or founded	Location
	Džungľa (I)	745 (▲)	.47	1990 (f.r 1929)	
	Kavečany (I)	1,377 (▲)	10.49	1976 (f.r. 1347)	
	Sever (I)	20,152 (▲)	54.61	n/a (f.r 1364)	
	Sídlisko Ťahanovce (I)	21,748 (▼)	8.25	1984	
	Staré Mesto (I)	20,861 (▲)	4.34	1230	
	Ťahanovce (I)	2,538 (▲)	7.27	1969 (f.r 1263)	
	Lorinčík (II)	888 (▲)	2.96	1248	
	Luník IX (II)	6,689 (▲)	1.06	1979	
	Myslava (II)	2,540 (▲)	7.01	1382	
	Pereš (II)	2,087 (▲)	1.33	1937	
	Poľov (II)	1,217 (▼)	12.95	1248	
	Sídlisko KVP (II)	23,253 (▼)	1.78	1980	
	Šaca (II)	6,032 (▲)	47.87	1275	
	Západ (II)	39,409 (▼)	5.53	1962	
	Dargovských hrdinov (III)	25,578 (▼)	11.07	1976	
	Košická Nová Ves (III)	2,957 (▲)	5.75	1968	
	Barca (IV)	3,734 (▼)	18.15	1215	
	Juh (IV)	22,572 (▼)	9.74	n/a	
	Krásna (IV)	6,101 (▲)	20.06	1143	
	Nad jazerom (IV)	24,215 (▼)	3.65	1275	
	Šebastovce (IV)	758 (▲)	5.09	1248	
	Vyšné Opátske (IV)	2,687 (▲)	4.19	1344	
Total	22 boroughs	238,138 (▼)	243		

The following table shows various quarters or localities in the boroughs.

Administrative and Territorial Division of Košice
Districts	Borough	Quarters or Localities
Košice I	Džungľa	Brody
Košice I	Kavečany	
Košice I	Košice-Sever	Anička, Bankov, Jahodná, Hradová (with Košice Castle), Sídlisko Watsonovo, Čermeľ, Mier, Kalvária
Košice I	Sídlisko Ťahanovce	Skalky
Košice I	Staré mesto	Huštáky, Letná, Stredné Mesto, Sídlisko Kuzmányho
Košice I	Ťahanovce	
Košice II	Lorinčík	Háje
Košice II	Luník IX	Nové diely
Košice II	Myslava	Maša, Povrazy
Košice II	Pereš	
Košice II	Poľov	
Košice II	Sídlisko KVP	
Košice II	Šaca	Bužinka
Košice II	Západ	Luník I-VIII
Košice III	Dargovských hrdinov	Dargovských hrdinov I-VII, Slivník
Košice III	Košická Nová Ves	Konopiská
Košice IV	Barca	
Košice IV	Juh	Železníky
Košice IV	Krásna	
Košice IV	Nad jazerom	Sídlisko Krásna
Košice IV	Šebastovce	
Košice IV	Vyšné Opátske	Heringeš

== Bibliography ==
- Kollár, Daniel (2003). Slovensko: putovanie po regiónoch [Slovakia: wandering through the regions] (in Slovak). Bratislava: Dajama. ISBN 978-80-88975-56-4. OCLC 237809739.
