= Pereš =

- Borough
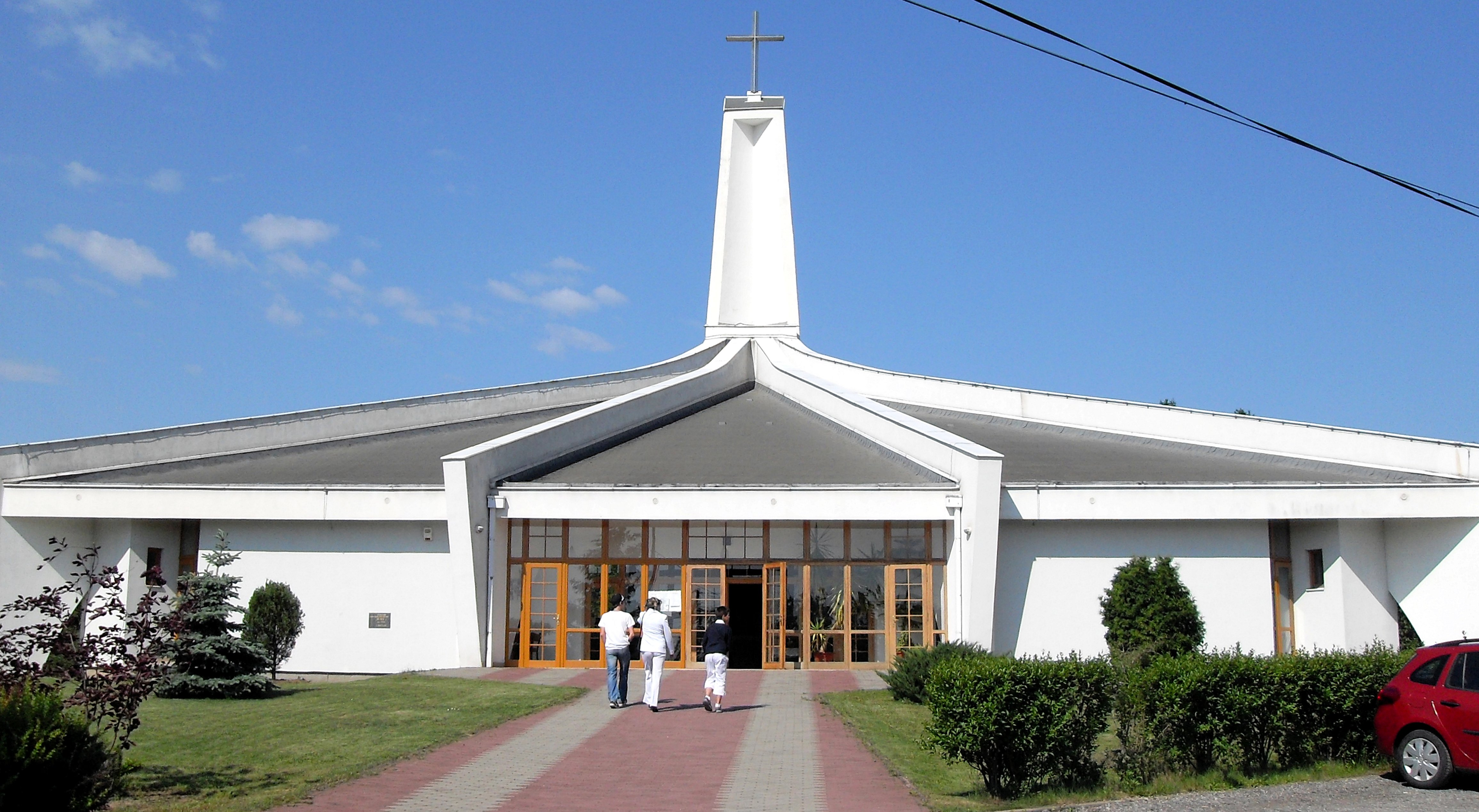
- Church of the Holy Trinity in Pereš

- Flag Coat of arms

- Location within Košice

- Location of Myslava in Slovakia
- Coordinates: 48°41′20″N 21°12′42″E
- Country: Slovakia
- Region: Košice
- District: Košice II
- Locality: 1937 (first known record)

Area
  - Total: 1.35 km^{2} (0.52 sq mi)
- Elevation: 297 m (974 ft)

Population (2025)
  - Total: 2,226
- Time zone: UTC+1 (CET)
  - Summer (DST): UTC+2 (CEST)
- Postal code: 040 11
- Area code: +421-55
- Vehicle registration plate (until 2022): KE
- Website: www.mcperes.sk

Pereš (Hungarian: Peres) is a borough (city ward) of the city of Košice, Slovakia. Located in the Košice II district, it lies at an altitude of roughly 297 metres (974 ft) above sea level, and is home to nearly 2,000 people. It is one of the smaller boroughs of its district and consists mainly of housing.

== History ==
One of the younger boroughs of the city, the first written record of Pereš dates back to 1937.

== Statistics ==
- Area: 1.33 square kilometres (0.51 sq mi)
- Population: 1,939 (31 December 2017)
- Density of population: 1,500/km^{2} (31 December 2017)
- District: Košice II
- Mayor: Jozef Karabin (as of 2018 elections)

== Geography ==
The municipality lies at an altitude of 297 metres (974 ft) and covers an area of 1.35 km^{2} (0.52 sq mi) (2025).

== Population ==
Population statistic (10 years)
Year	1995	2005	2015	2025
Count	0	1175	1838	2226
Difference		–	+56.42%	+21.10%

Population statistic
Year	2024	2025
Count	2205	2226
Difference		+0.95%

It has a population of 2226 people (31 December 2025).

=== Ethnicity ===
Census 2021 (1+%)
Ethnicity	Number	Fraction
Slovak	1906	91.67%
Hungarian	83	3.99%
Not found out	79	3.79%
Rusyn	33	1.58%
Czech	25	1.2%
Total	2079	

In year 2021 was 2079 people by ethnicity 1906 as Slovak, 83 as Hungarian, 79 as Not found out, 33 as Rusyn, 25 as Czech, 15 as Other, 10 as Ukrainian, 10 as German, 4 as Vietnamese, 4 as Polish, 3 as Romanian, 3 as Bulgarian, 2 as Russian, 1 as Jewish, 1 as Serbian, 1 as Austrian, 1 as French and 1 as Croatian.

Note on population: The difference values of population numbers in the table "Population statistic" and in the sections "Ethnicity" & "Religion" is caused by the use of various statistical methods.

=== Religion ===
Census 2021 (1+%)
Religion	Number	Fraction
Roman Catholic Church	936	45.02%
None	594	28.57%
Greek Catholic Church	140	6.73%
Not found out	86	4.14%
Apostolic Church	86	4.14%
Evangelical Church	70	3.37%
Calvinist Church	56	2.69%
Baptists Church	21	1.01%
Total	2079	

In year 2021 was 2079 people by religion 936 from Roman Catholic Church, 594 from None, 140 from Greek Catholic Church, 86 from Not found out, 86 from Apostolic Church, 70 from Evangelical Church, 56 from Calvinist Church, 21 from Baptists Church, 18 from Eastern Orthodox Church, 12 from Other and not ascertained christian church, 11 from Jehovah's Witnesses, 11 from Church of the Brethren, 8 from Ad hoc movements, 7 from Other, 6 from Christian Congregations in Slovakia, 6 from Seventh-day Adventist Church, 4 from Buddhism, 3 from Paganism and natural spirituality, 3 from Islam and 1 from Old Catholic Church.

== Gallery ==
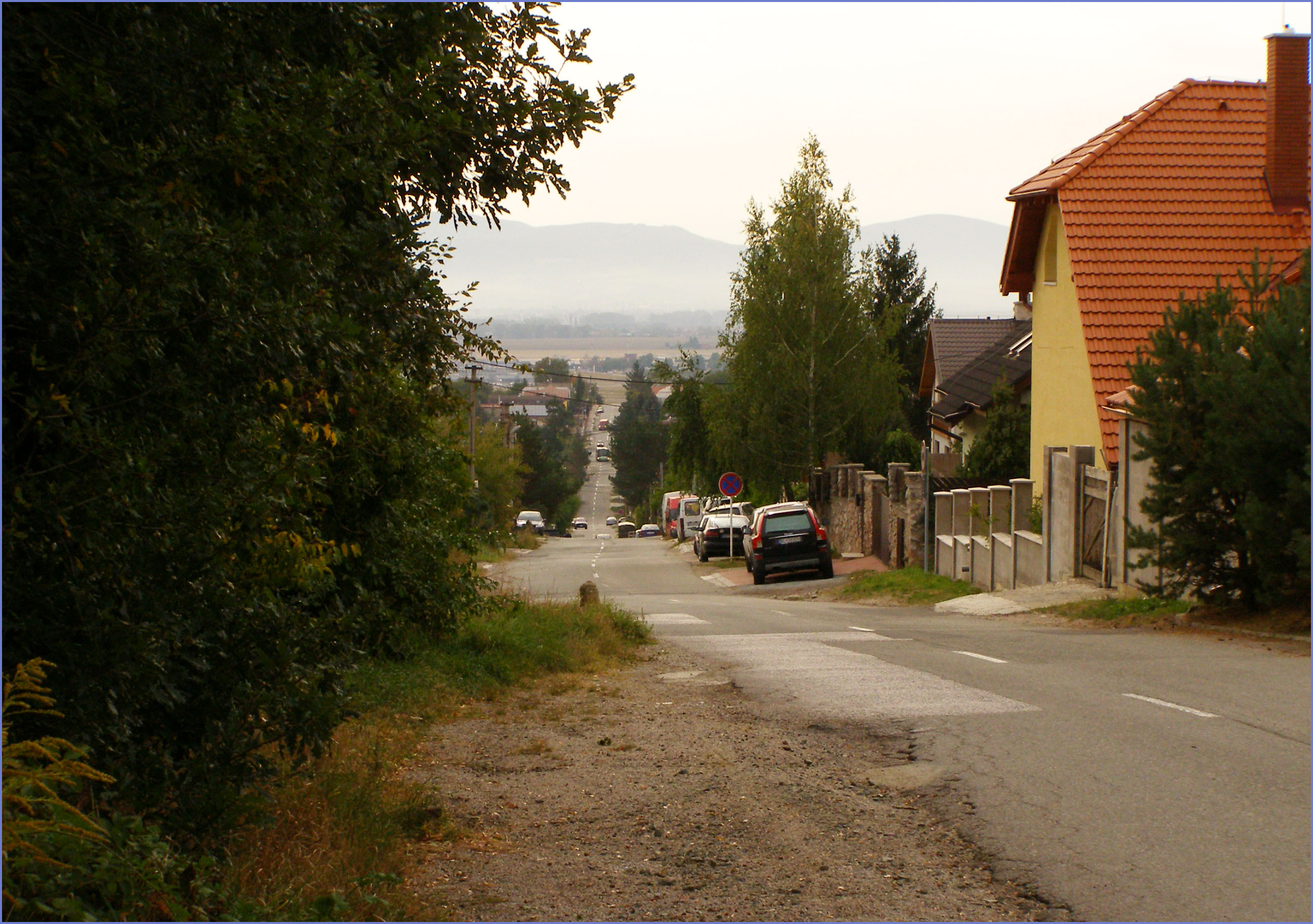
Bystrická Street

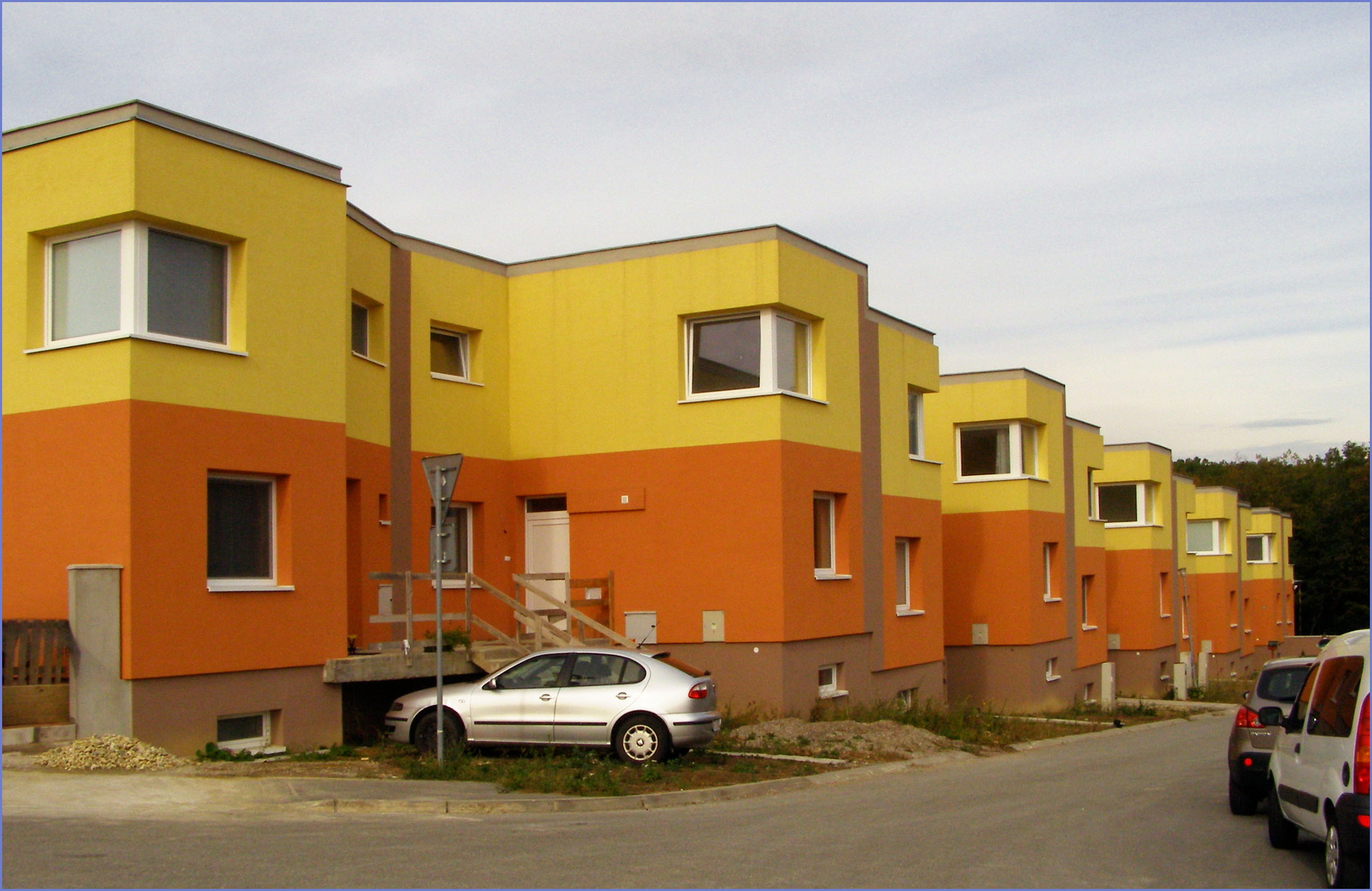
Newer housing development in the Pereš borough

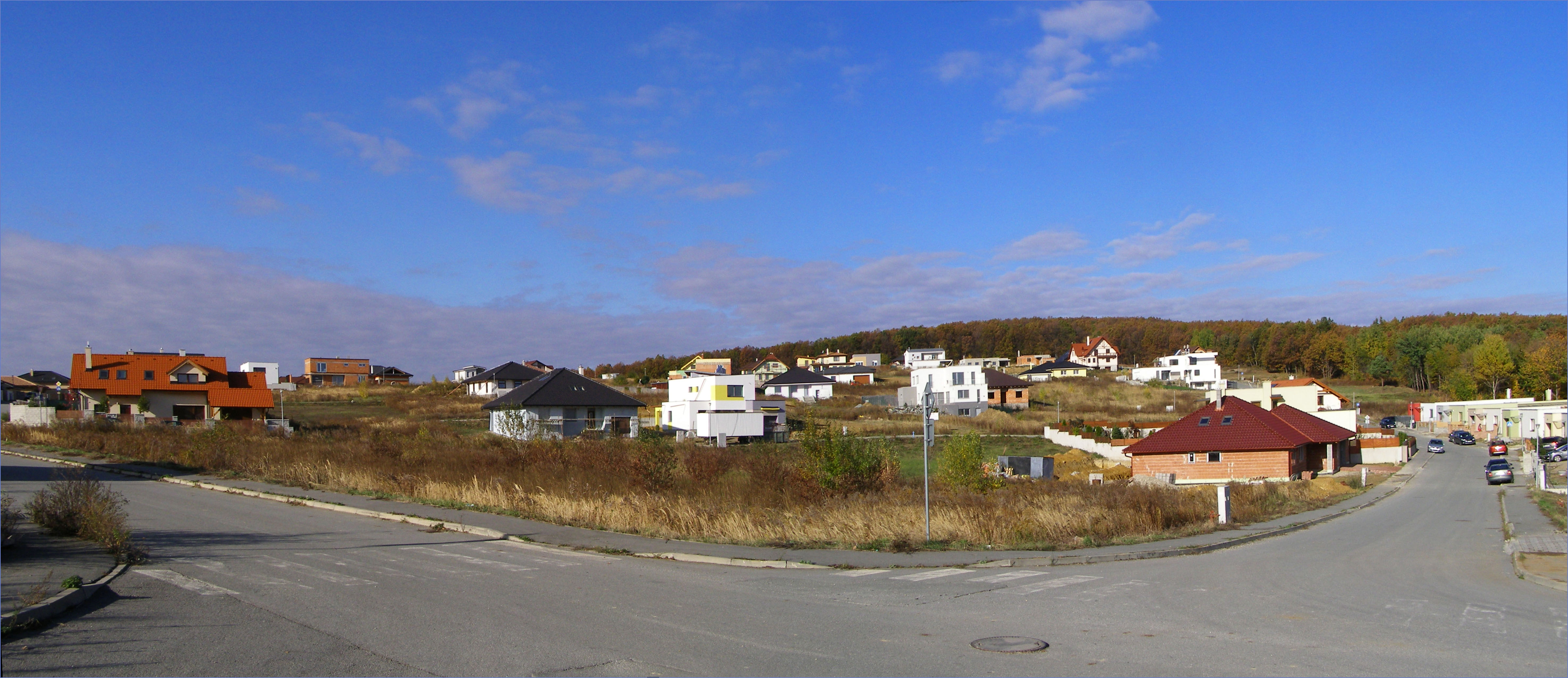
Newer housing development in the Pereš borough

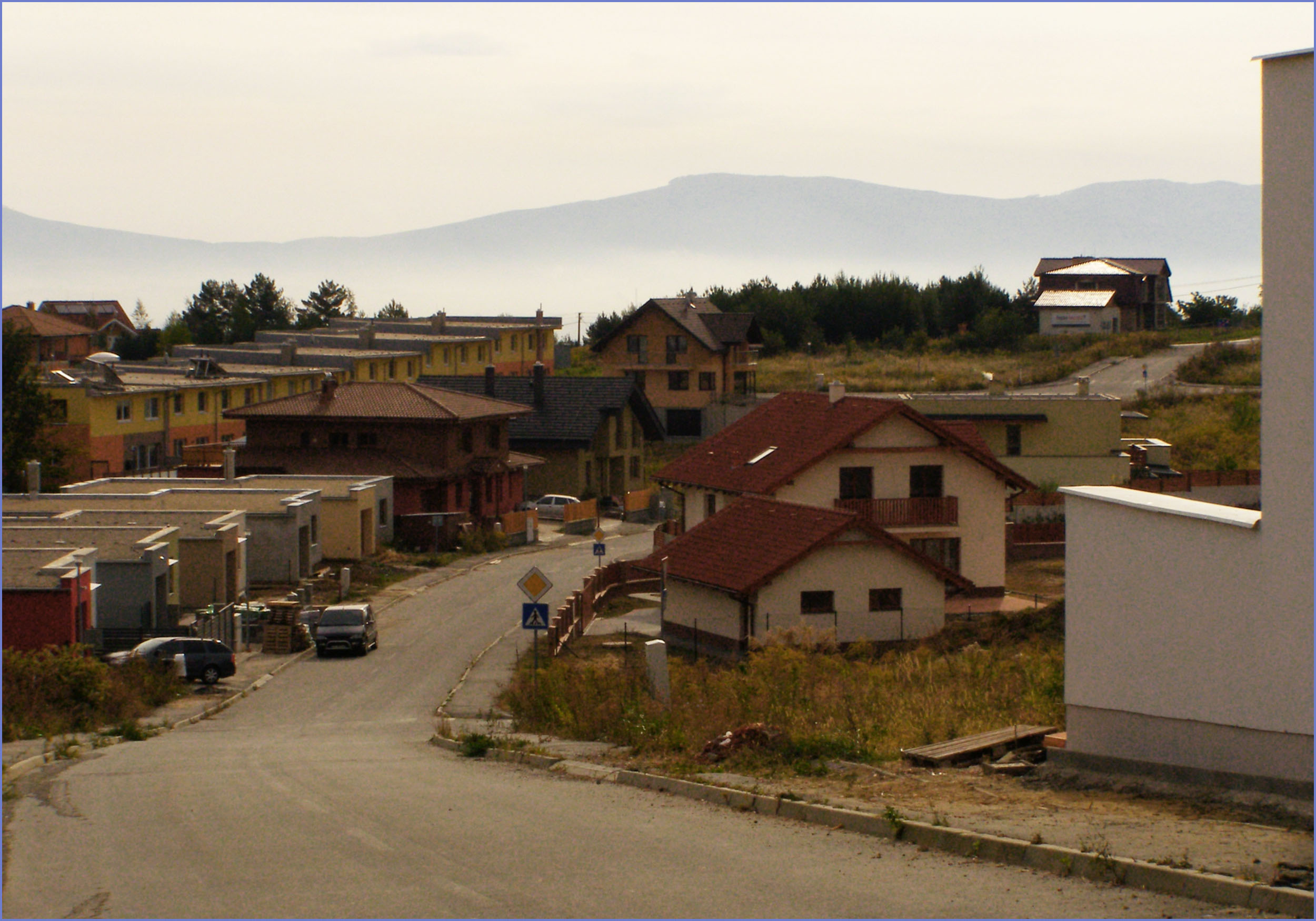
Newer housing development in the Pereš borough

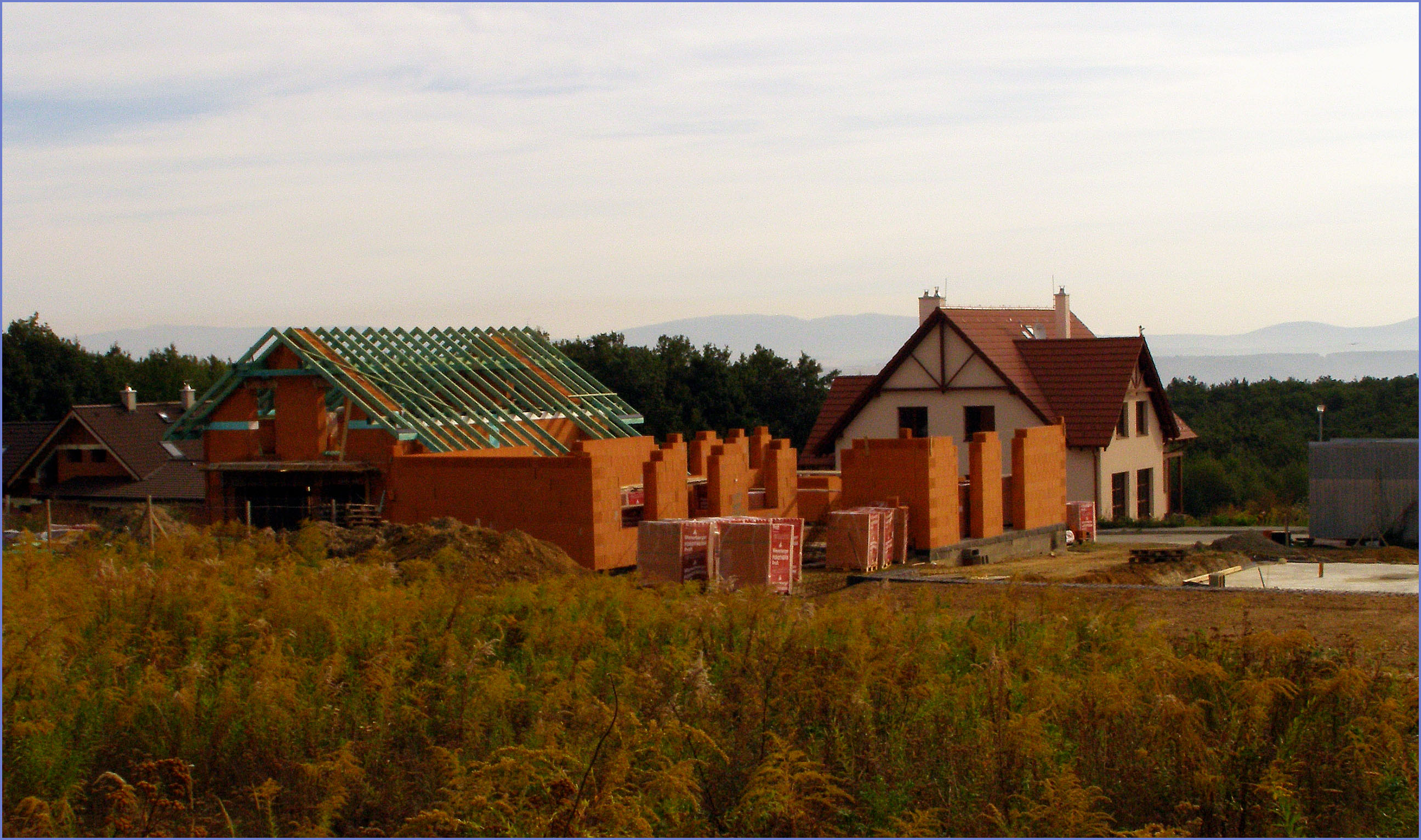
Newer housing development in the Pereš borough
