= Džungľa =

Coordinates: 48°44′14″N 21°16′5″E

- Borough
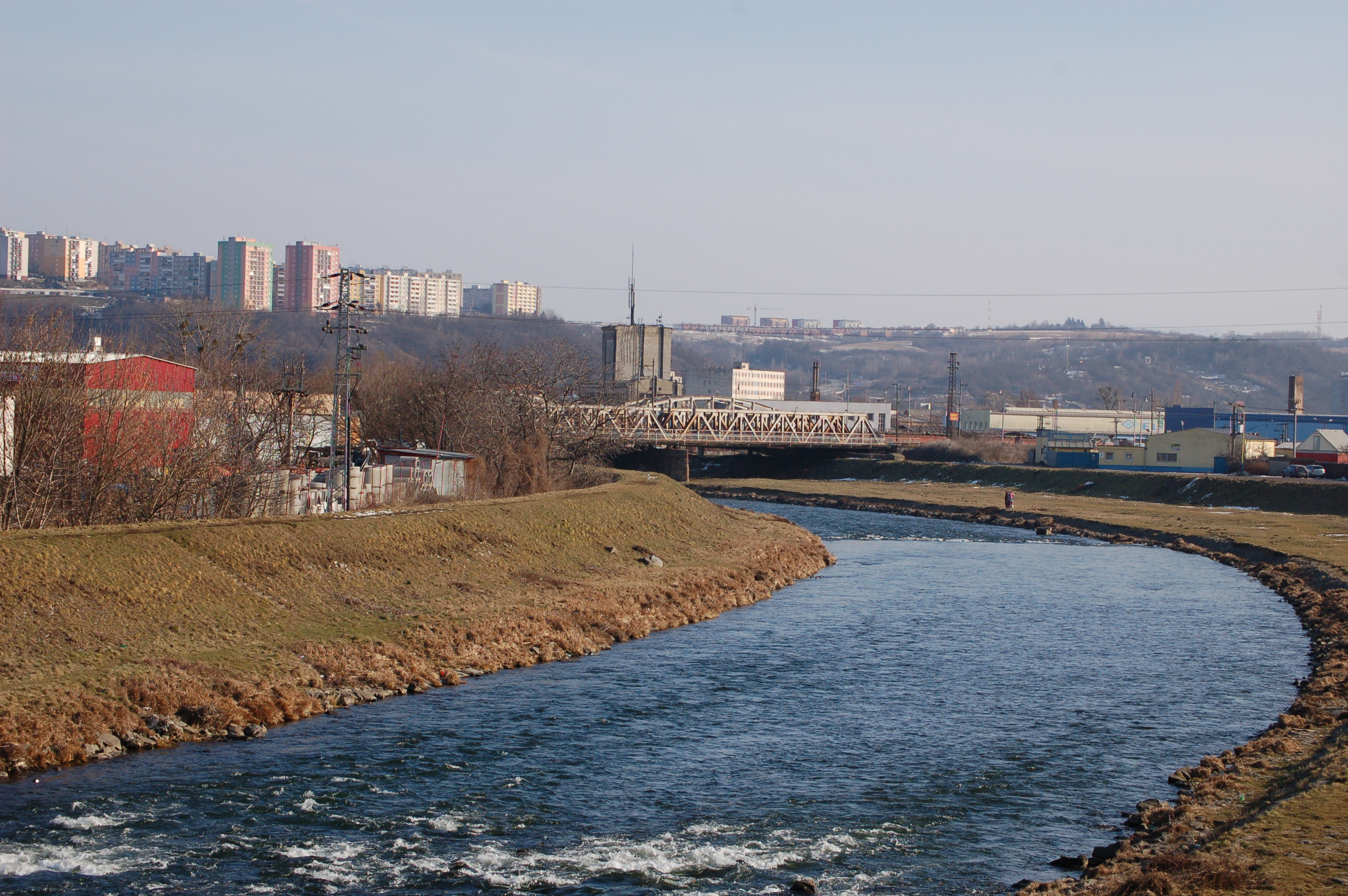
- A stretch of the Hornád river flowing through the Džungľa borough (February 2013)

- Flag Coat of arms

- Location within Košice

- Location of Džungľa in Slovakia
- Country: Slovakia
- Region: Košice
- District: Košice I
- Locality: 1929 (first known record)
- Borough: 1990

Area
  - Total: 0.46 km^{2} (0.18 sq mi)
- Elevation: 209 m (686 ft)

Population (2025)
  - Total: 797

Population by ethnicity (2011)
  - Slovak: 76.9%
  - Roma: 2.1%
  - Hungarian: 0.8%
  - Other: 1.9%
  - Unreported: 18.3%

Population by religion (2011)
  - Roman Catholic: 42.2%
  - Greek Catholic: 6.6%
  - Orthodox: 4.5%
  - Jehovah's Witness: 2.7%
  - Other: 3.9%
  - Non-religious: 20%
  - Unreported: 20.1%
- Time zone: UTC+1 (CET)
  - Summer (DST): UTC+2 (CEST)
- Postal code: 040 13
- Area code: +421-55
- Vehicle registration plate (until 2022): KE
- Website: N/A

Džungľa (literally: "Jungle", Hungarian: Dzsungel) is a borough (city ward) of Košice, Slovakia. The borough is situated in the Košice I district and lies to the northeast of the neighbouring borough of Košice Old Town, at an altitude of roughly 209 metres (686 ft) above sea level.

Džungľa gained its distinctive name in the interwar period and was made an official borough in the early 1990s. It is the smallest of all 22 of Košice's boroughs, and is also one of the least populous overall.

The borough is largely focused on housing (with a few hundred residents), industrial areas and shopping centres.

== History ==
Today's borough of Džungľa developed during the interwar period, its nickname (later adopted as an official name) first appeared in the late 1920s.

Džungľa became a separate borough of Košice, as part of the Košice I district, in 1990.

== Statistics ==
- Area: 0.47 square kilometres (0.18 sq mi)
- Population: 697 (December 2017)
- Density of population: 1500/km^{2} (December 2017)
- District: Košice I
- Mayor: Adriana Šebeščáková Balogová (as of 2018 elections)

== Geography ==
The municipality lies at an altitude of 209 metres (686 ft) and covers an area of 0.46 km^{2} (0.18 sq mi) (2025).

== Population ==
Population statistic (10 years)
Year	1995	2005	2015	2025
Count	0	498	679	797
Difference		–	+36.34%	+17.37%

Population statistic
Year	2024	2025
Count	769	797
Difference		+3.64%

It has a population of 797 people (31 December 2025).

=== Ethnicity ===
Census 2021 (1+ %)
Ethnicity	Number	Fraction
Slovak	686	91.46%
Romani	164	21.86%
Not found out	53	7.06%
Czech	11	1.46%
Other	9	1.2%
Total	750	

In year 2021 was 750 people by ethnicity 686 as Slovak, 164 as Romani, 53 as Not found out, 11 as Czech, 9 as Other, 5 as Rusyn, 5 as Canadian, 4 as Italian, 4 as Hungarian, 1 as Ukrainian and 1 as Bulgarian.

Note on population: The difference values of population numbers in the table "Population statistic" and in the sections "Ethnicity" & "Religion" is caused by the use of various statistical methods.

=== Religion ===
Census 2021 (1+ %)
Religion	Number	Fraction
Roman Catholic Church	340	45.33%
None	170	22.67%
Not found out	108	14.4%
Greek Catholic Church	75	10%
Evangelical Church	13	1.73%
Eastern Orthodox Church	11	1.47%
Apostolic Church	11	1.47%
Total	750	

In year 2021 was 750 people by religion 340 from Roman Catholic Church, 170 from None, 108 from Not found out, 75 from Greek Catholic Church, 13 from Evangelical Church, 11 from Eastern Orthodox Church, 11 from Apostolic Church, 6 from Jehovah's Witnesses, 4 from Calvinist Church, 3 from Christian Congregations in Slovakia, 3 from Baptists Church, 2 from Old Catholic Church, 2 from Ad hoc movements, 1 from United Methodist Church and 1 from Czechoslovak Hussite Church.

== Gallery ==
Photos

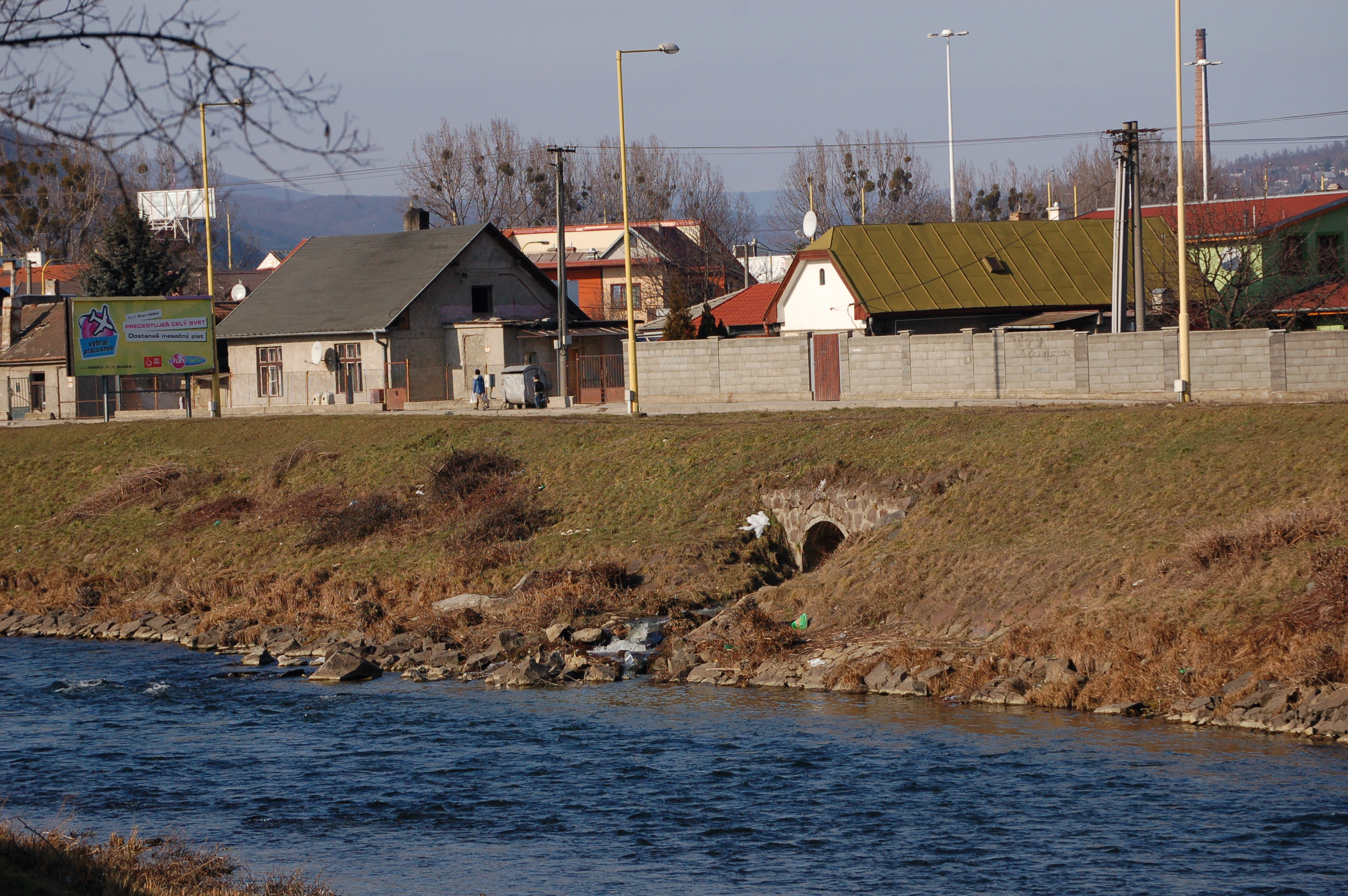
Confluence of the river Hornád and the local stream Moňok, older housing at the riverfront

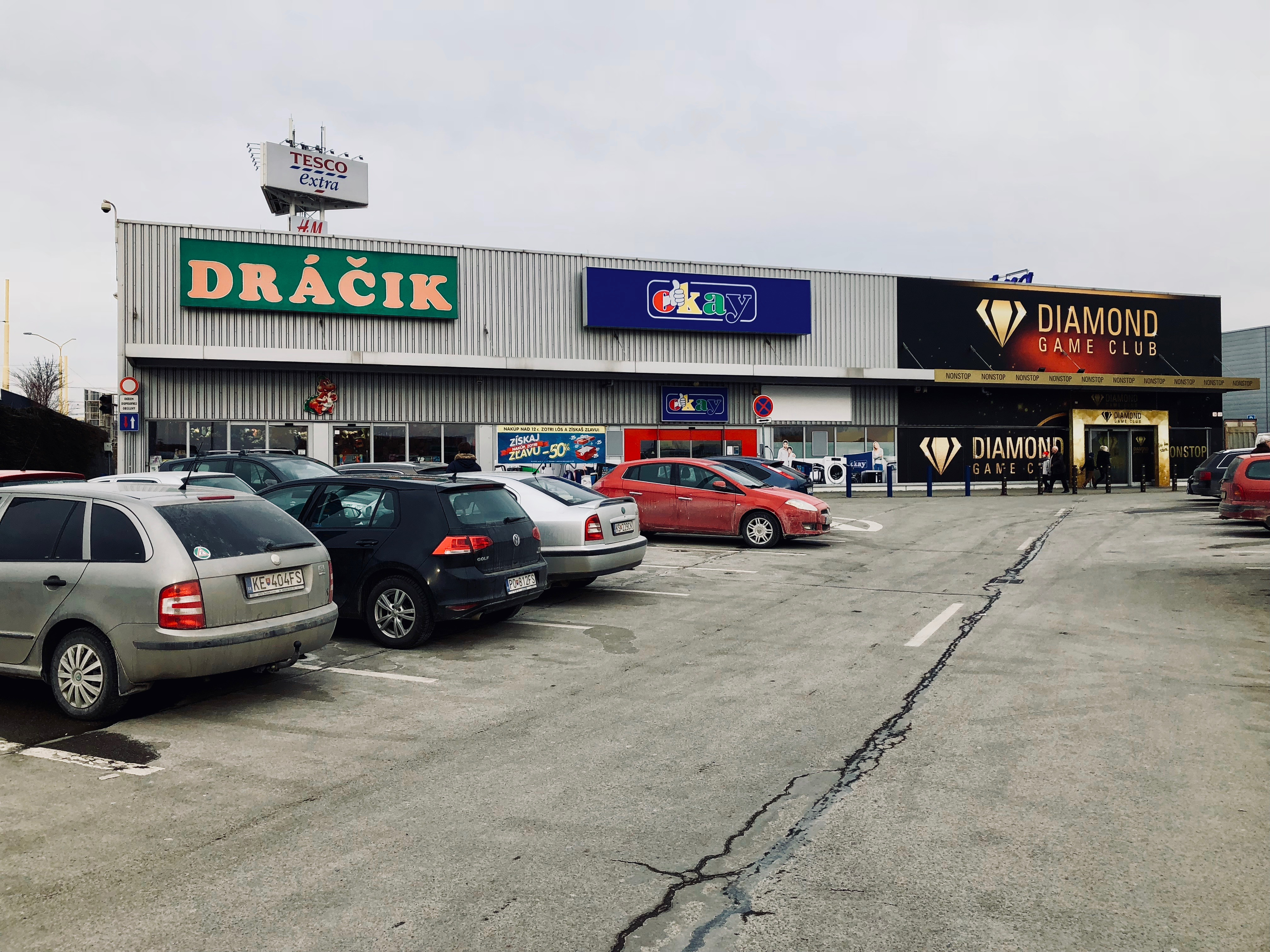
A local shopping centre in Džungľa

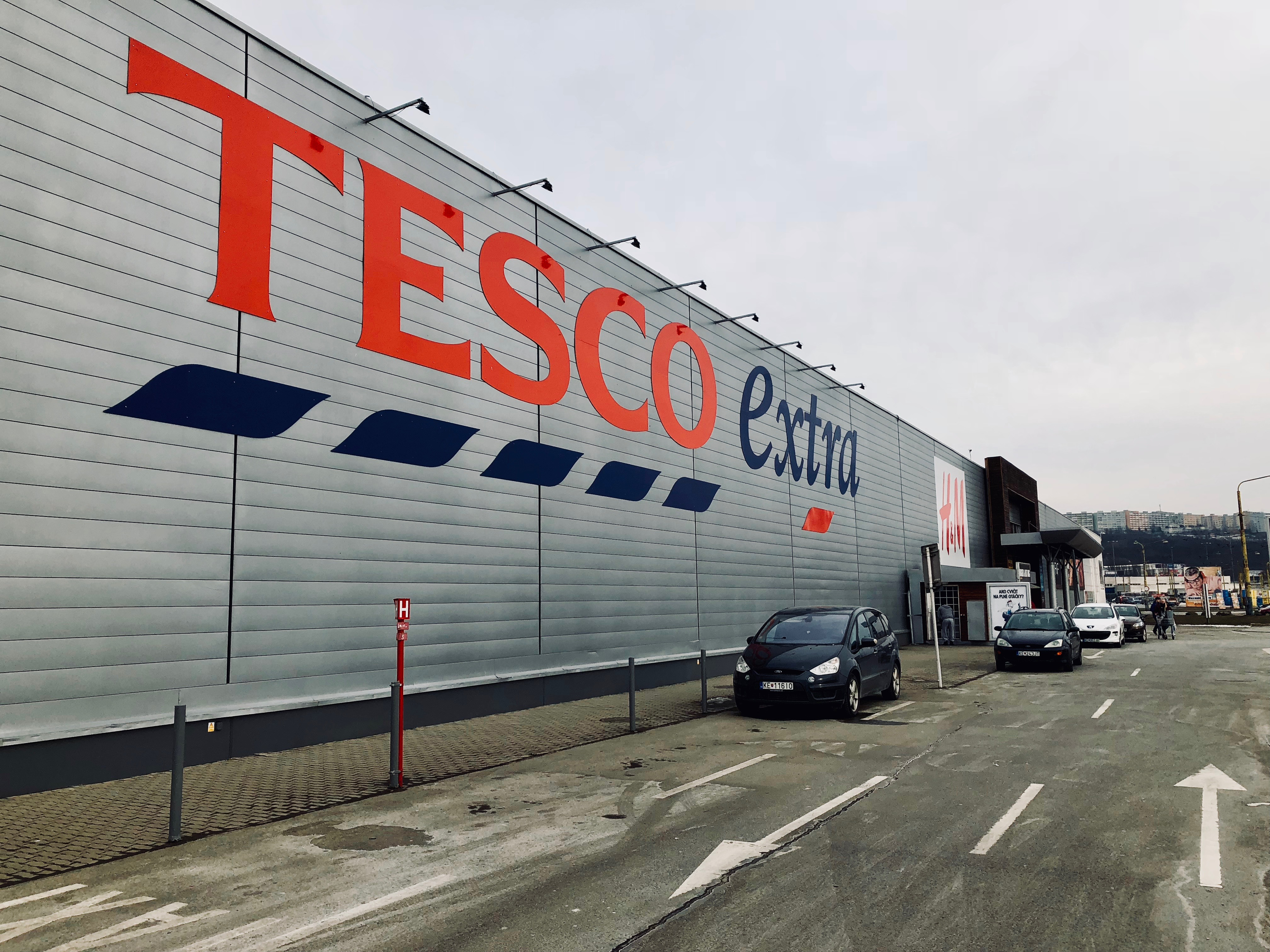
A "Tesco Extra" shopping centre in Džungľa

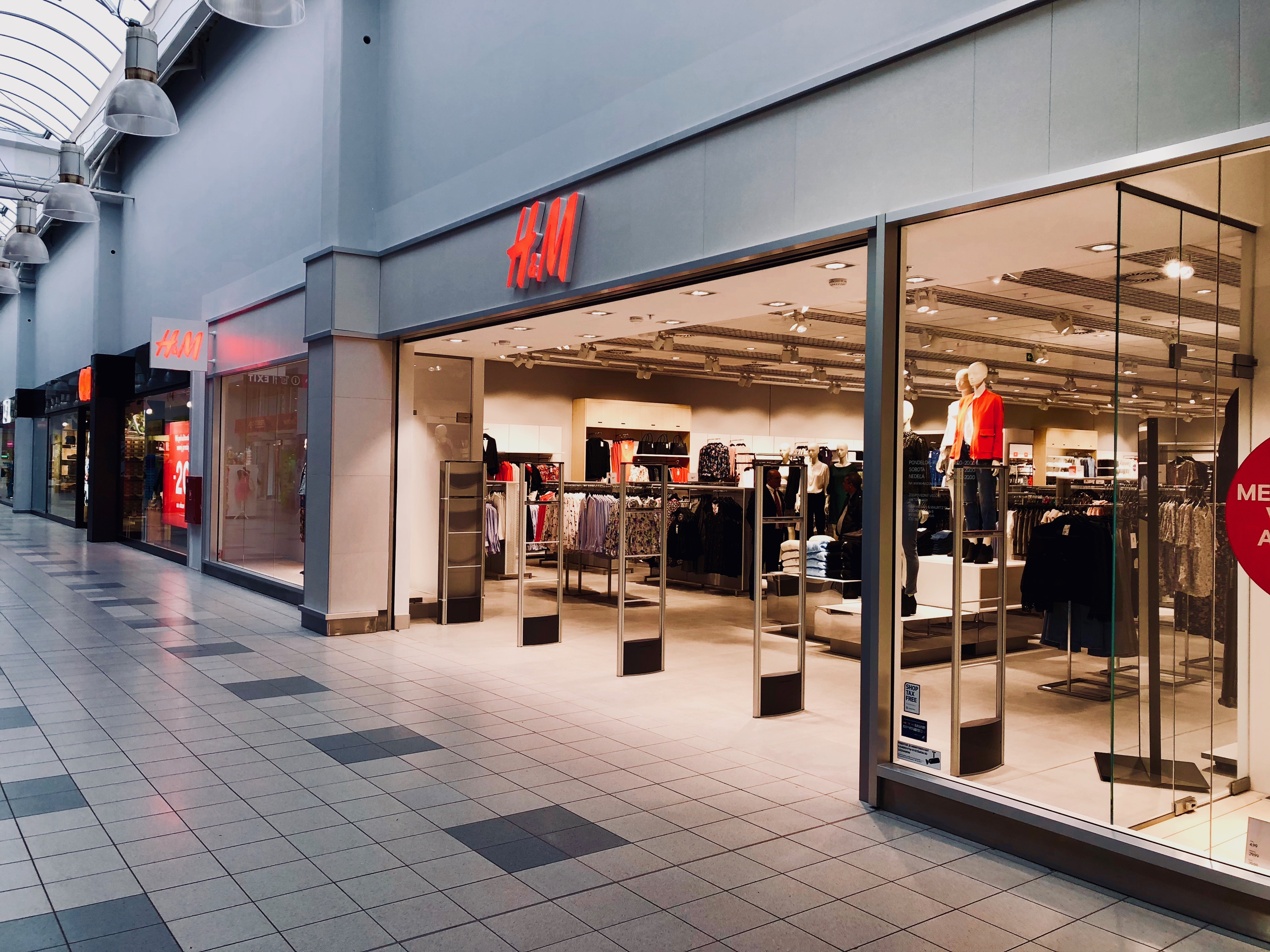
Interior of a local shopping centre

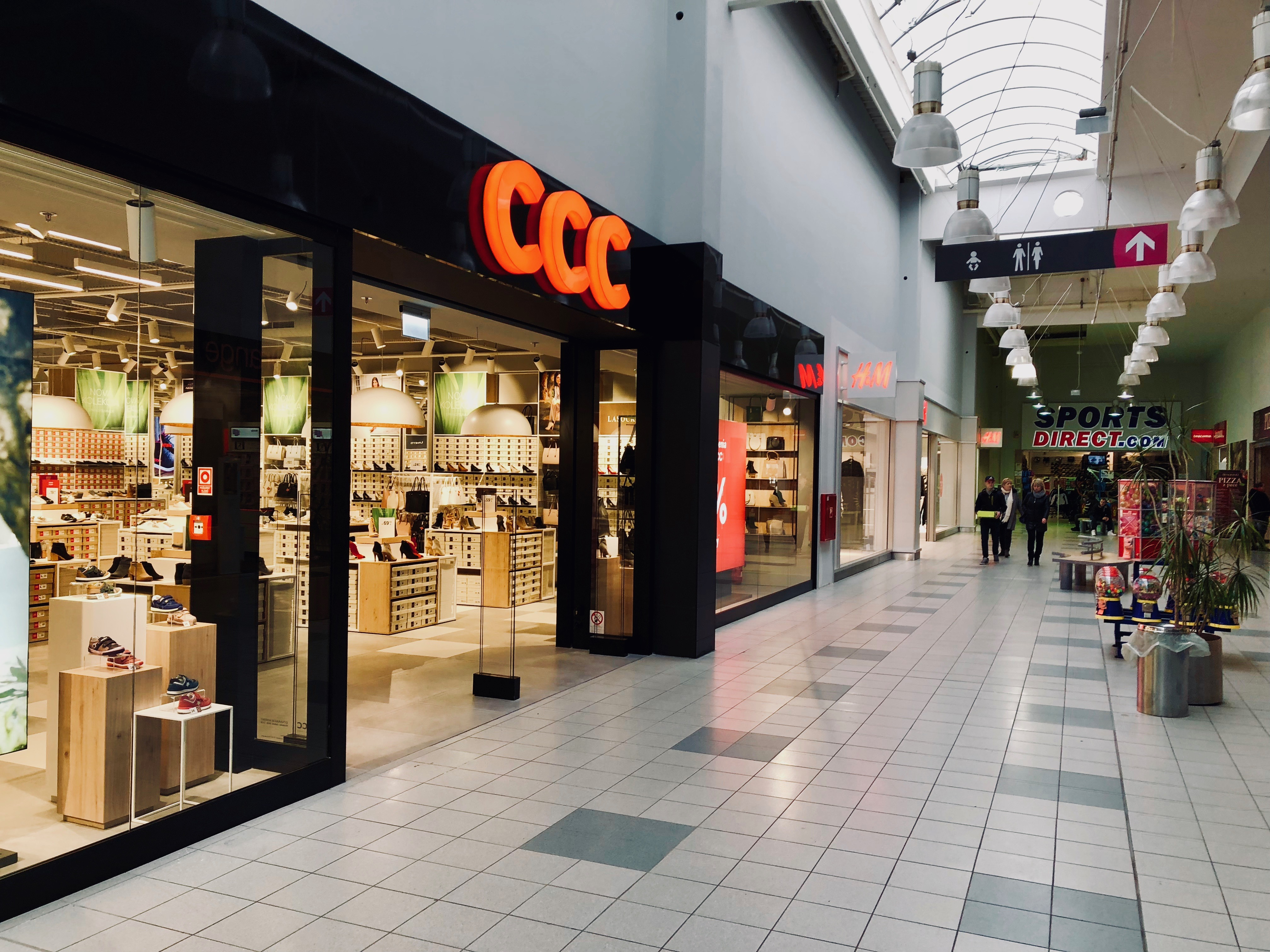
Interior of a local shopping centre

Maps of the area

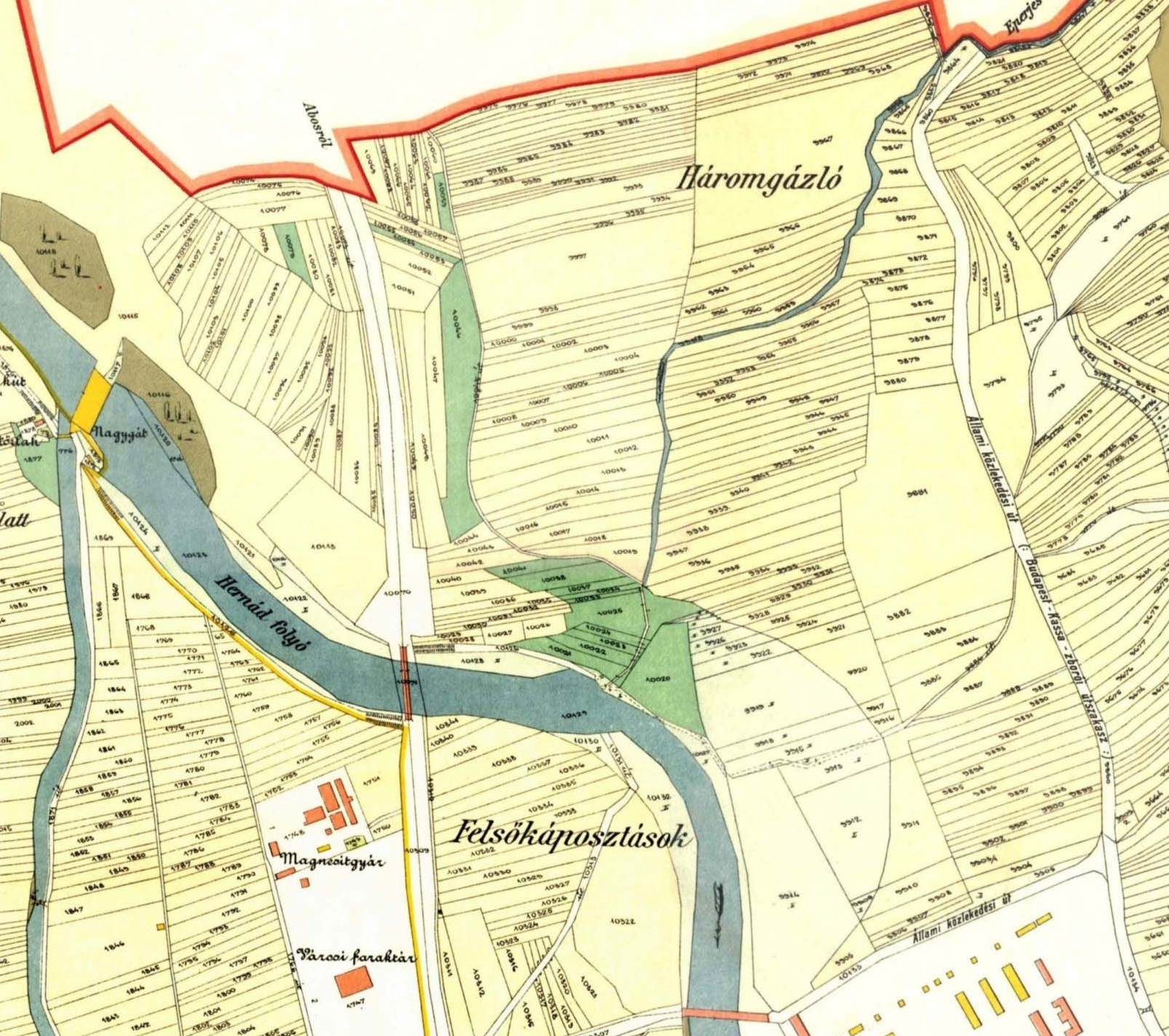
A 1912 map of the Džungľa locality

A modern map of the Džungľa borough
