= Lorinčík =

Coordinates: 48°41′N 21°12′E

- Borough
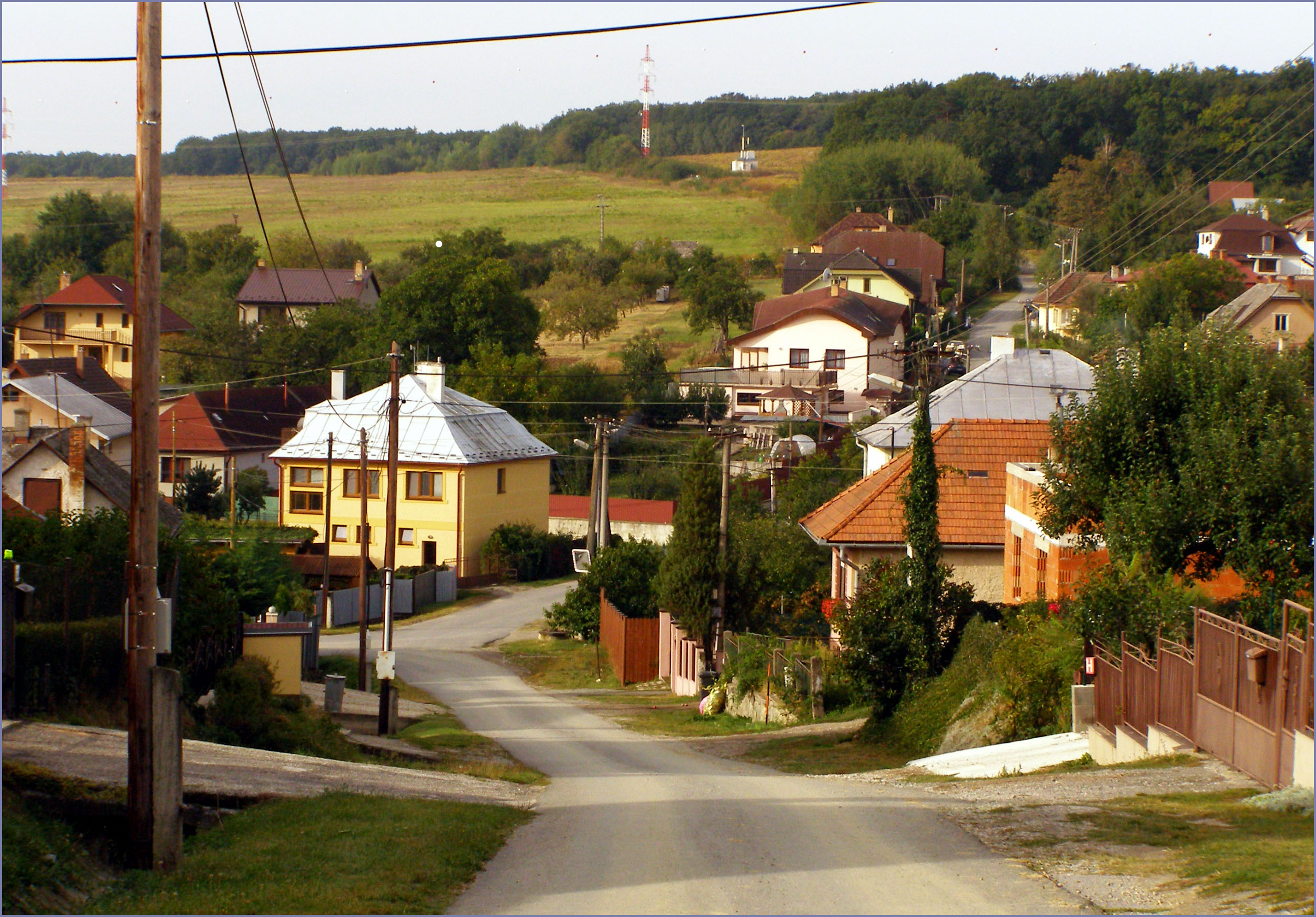
- Street and housing in a part of Lorinčík

- Flag Coat of arms

- Location within Košice

- Location of Lorinčík in Slovakia
- Country: Slovakia
- Region: Košice
- District: Košice II
- Village: 1248 (first written record)
- Borough: 1991 (current form)

Area
  - Total: 2.98 km^{2} (1.15 sq mi)
- Elevation: 302 m (991 ft)

Population (2025)
  - Total: 1,290
- Time zone: UTC+1 (CET)
  - Summer (DST): UTC+2 (CEST)
- Postal code: 040 11
- Area code: +421-55
- Vehicle registration plate (until 2022): KE
- Website: www.lorincik.eu

Lorinčík (Hungarian: Szentlőrincke) is a borough (city ward) of Košice, Slovakia. Lorinčík is located in the Košice II district, at an altitude of roughly 302 metres (991 ft) above sea level. It is one of the westernmost boroughs of Košice and retains its traditionally rural character.

== History ==
The first written records of Lorinčík date as far back as 1248, when the local area and settlement was known as Gord. The settlement and its name had fallen out of use by the early 16th century, with the name Lorinčík replacing it since the 16th century. The name of the village originated from the chapel, which was dedicated to Saint Lawrence. In the 18th century, Lorinčík was possibly abandoned, as it's missing from most records from the period, though it reemerges again as a settled place by 1808. In the mid-1800s, it's noted as a mostly Slovak village. Lorinčík became a borough of Košice in the 20th century and has had its own municipal government since 1991.

The current Church of St Lawrence in the borough, a protected landmark, was built in 1932. However, the patronage of St Lawrence for the locality dates back to at least the early modern period, when an older chapel or church dedicated to St Lawrence already stood in the area. The etymology of Lorinčík (derived from "Lawrence") seems to be based on the traditional use of this specific patron saint in the former village. The borough's current official name in Hungarian is Szentlőrincke ("Little St. Lawrence") and its historical Hungarian name was Lőrincke.

=== Evolution of the borough's name ===
- 1406 – Zenthlewrench
- 1426 – predium Zenthlewryncz alio nomine Felgard
- 1427 – predium Zenthlewrincz alio nomine Felgard
- 1553 – Zenthlorincz
- 1808 – Lořinčík, Lořinček (Slovak) Lőrinczke (Hungarian)
- 1863—1895 – Lőrincke
- 1898—1913, 1938—1945 Szentlőrincke
- 1906 – slovensky: Ľorinčík
- 1920—1938, 1945 – Lorinčík

== Statistics ==
- Area: 2.97 square kilometres (1.15 sq mi)
- Population: 888 (31 December 2020)
- Population density: 298/km² (31 December 2020)
- District: Košice II
- Mayor: Damián Exner (as of 2018 elections)

== Geography ==
The municipality lies at an altitude of 302 metres (991 ft) and covers an area of 2.98 km^{2} (1.15 sq mi) (2025).

== Population ==
Population statistic (10 years)
Year	1995	2005	2015	2025
Count	0	381	636	1290
Difference		–	+66.92%	+102.83%

Population statistic
Year	2024	2025
Count	1203	1290
Difference		+7.23%

It has a population of 1290 people (31 December 2025).

=== Ethnicity ===
Census 2021 (1+ %)
Ethnicity	Number	Fraction
Slovak	841	95.24%
Hungarian	24	2.71%
Not found out	21	2.37%
Rusyn	11	1.24%
Total	883	

In year 2021 was 883 people by ethnicity 841 as Slovak, 24 as Hungarian, 21 as Not found out, 11 as Rusyn, 4 as Czech, 4 as German, 2 as Ukrainian, 2 as Romanian, 1 as Jewish, 1 as Romani, 1 as Austrian and 1 as Polish.

Note on population: The difference values of population numbers in the table "Population statistic" and in the sections "Ethnicity" & "Religion" is caused by the use of various statistical methods.

=== Religion ===
Census 2021 (1+ %)
Religion	Number	Fraction
Roman Catholic Church	548	62.06%
None	183	20.72%
Greek Catholic Church	69	7.81%
Not found out	22	2.49%
Apostolic Church	20	2.27%
Evangelical Church	15	1.7%
Total	883	

In year 2021 was 883 people by religion 548 from Roman Catholic Church, 183 from None, 69 from Greek Catholic Church, 22 from Not found out, 20 from Apostolic Church, 15 from Evangelical Church, 8 from Calvinist Church, 6 from Eastern Orthodox Church, 3 from Other and not ascertained christian church, 3 from Bahá'i Community, 2 from Jewish community, 2 from Ad hoc movements, 1 from Other and 1 from Church of Jesus Christ of Latter-day Saints.

== Gallery ==
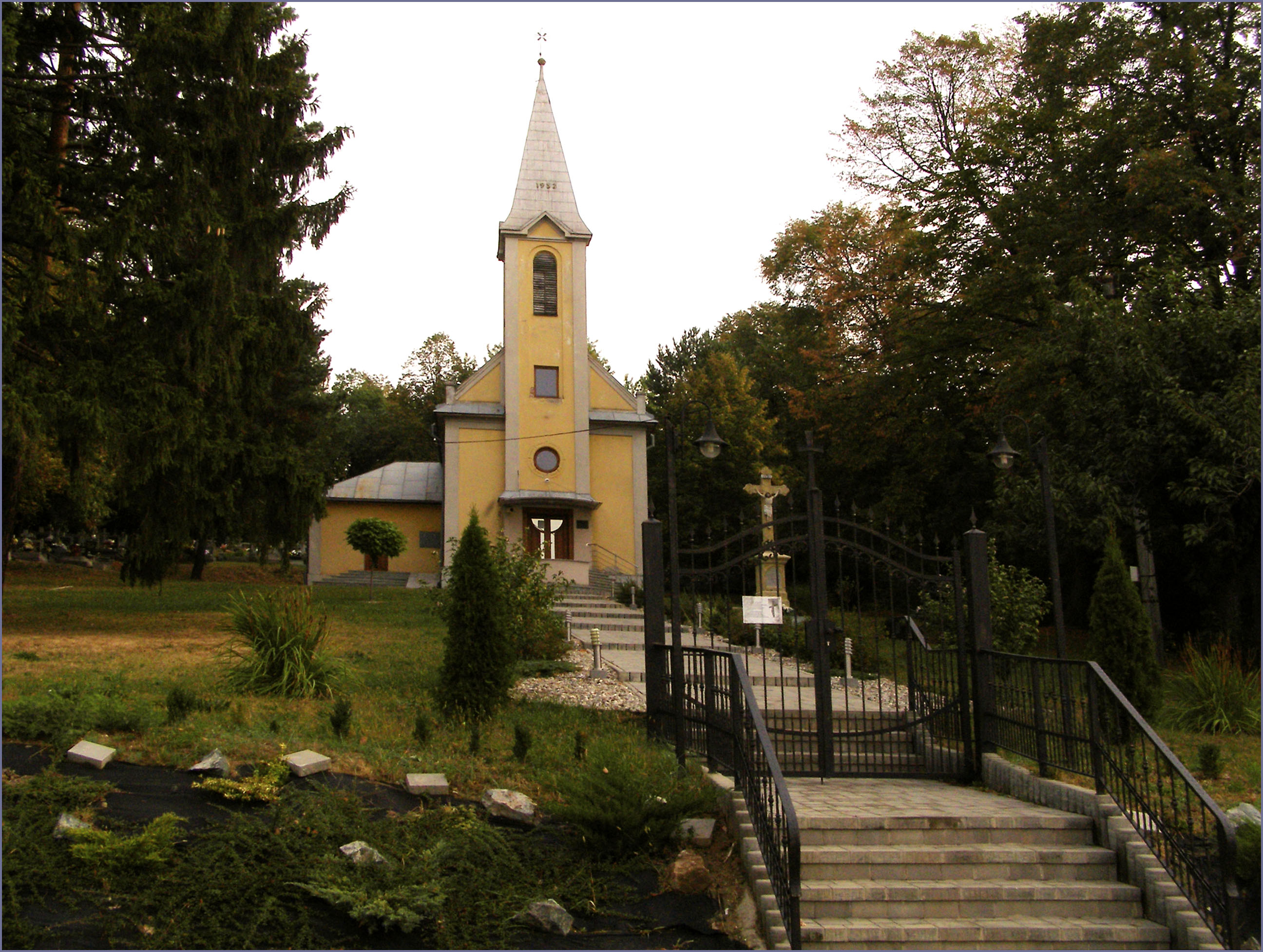
The Church of St. Lawrence in Lorinčík

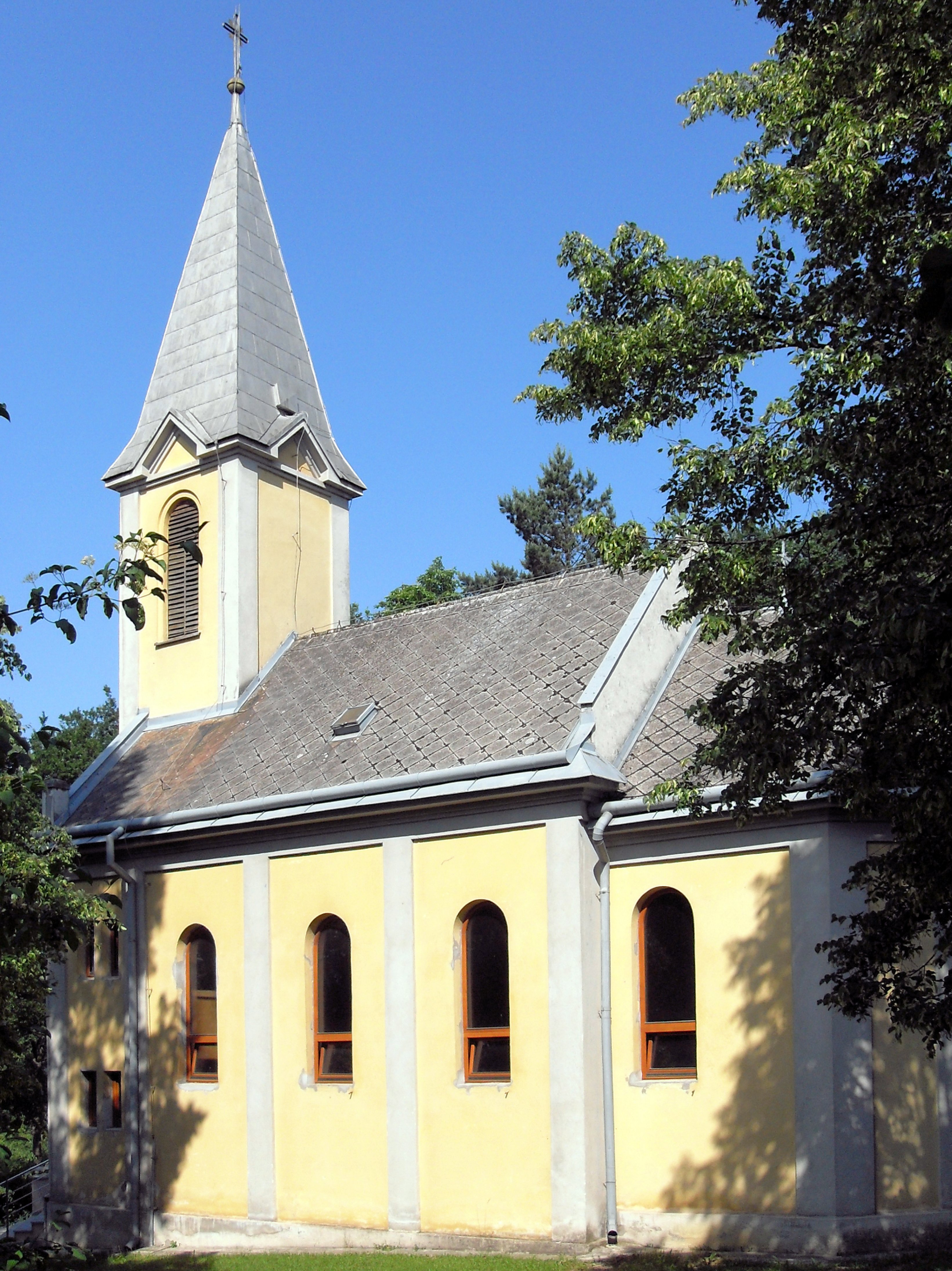
The Church of St. Lawrence in Lorinčík

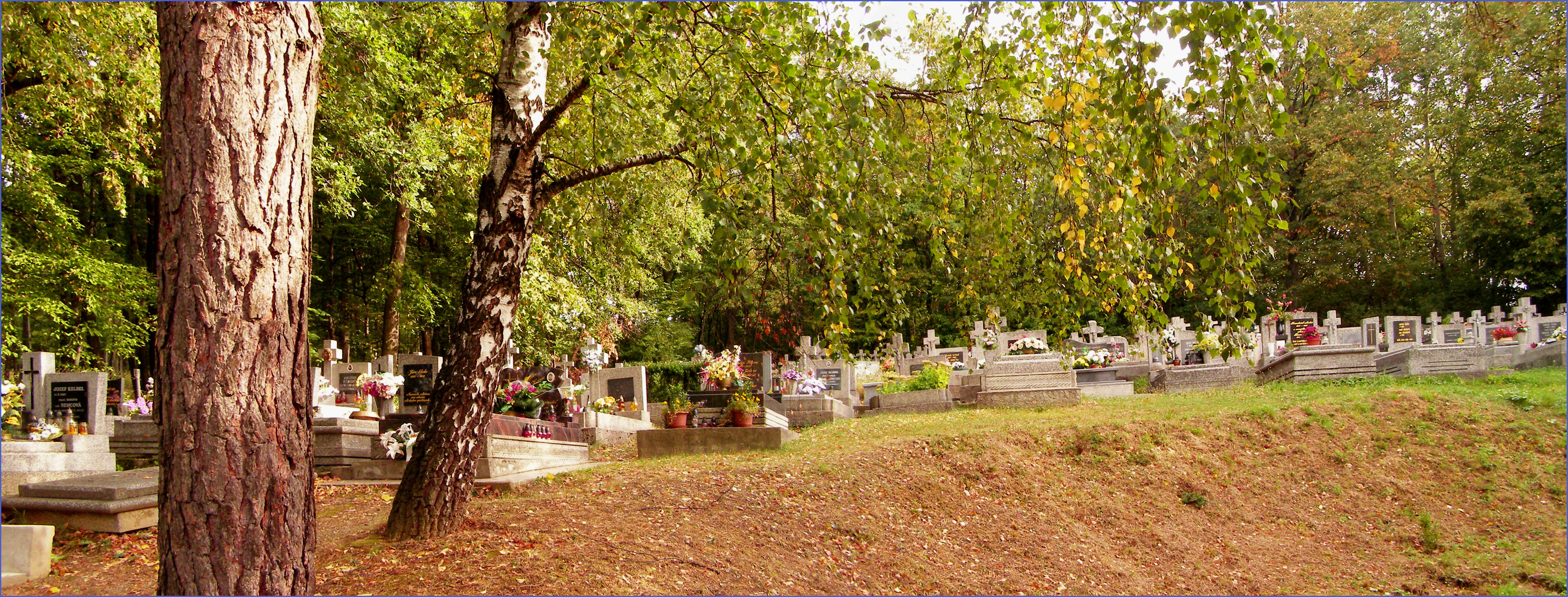
Local cemetery in Lorinčík

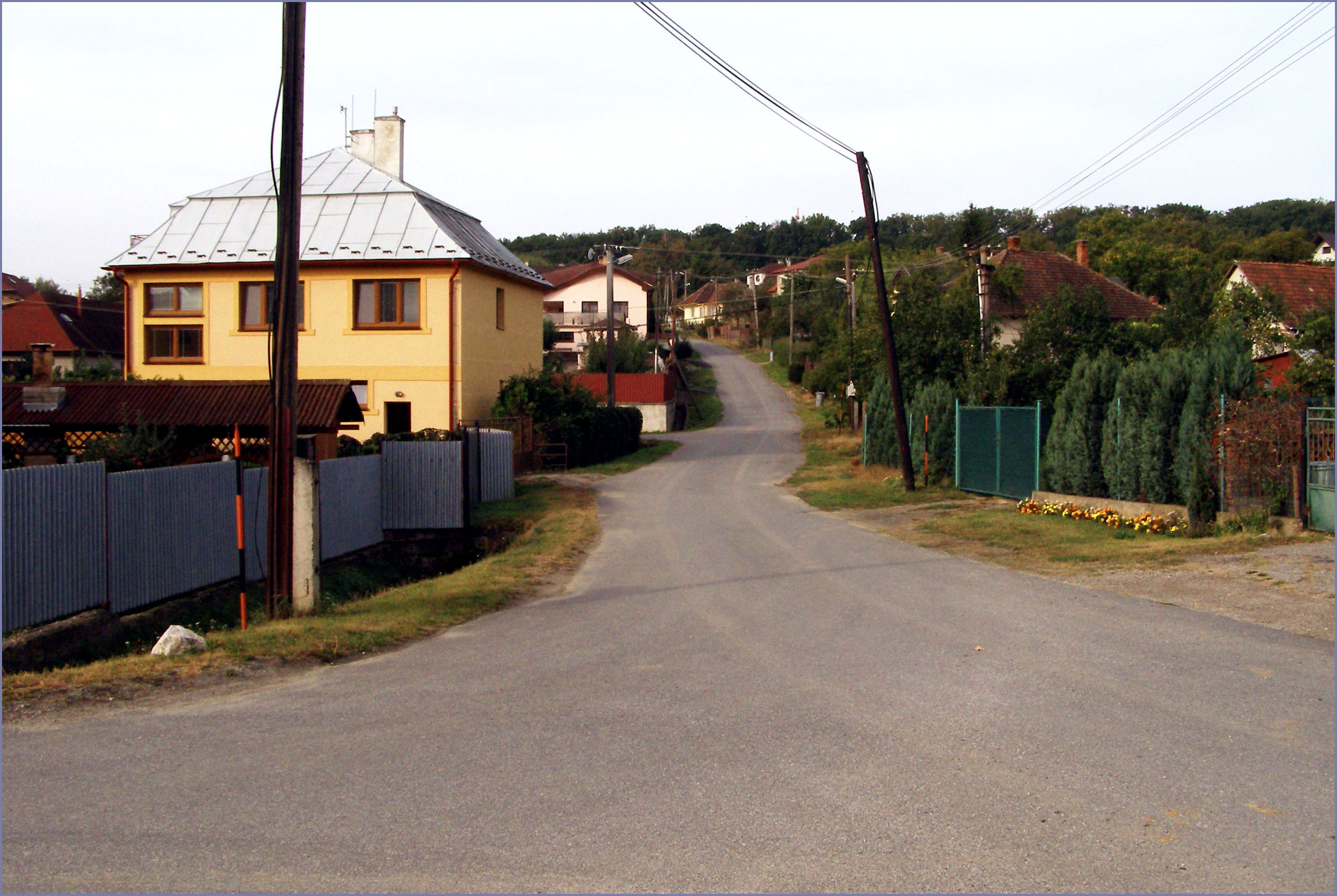
A street in the borough, leading uphill to the church

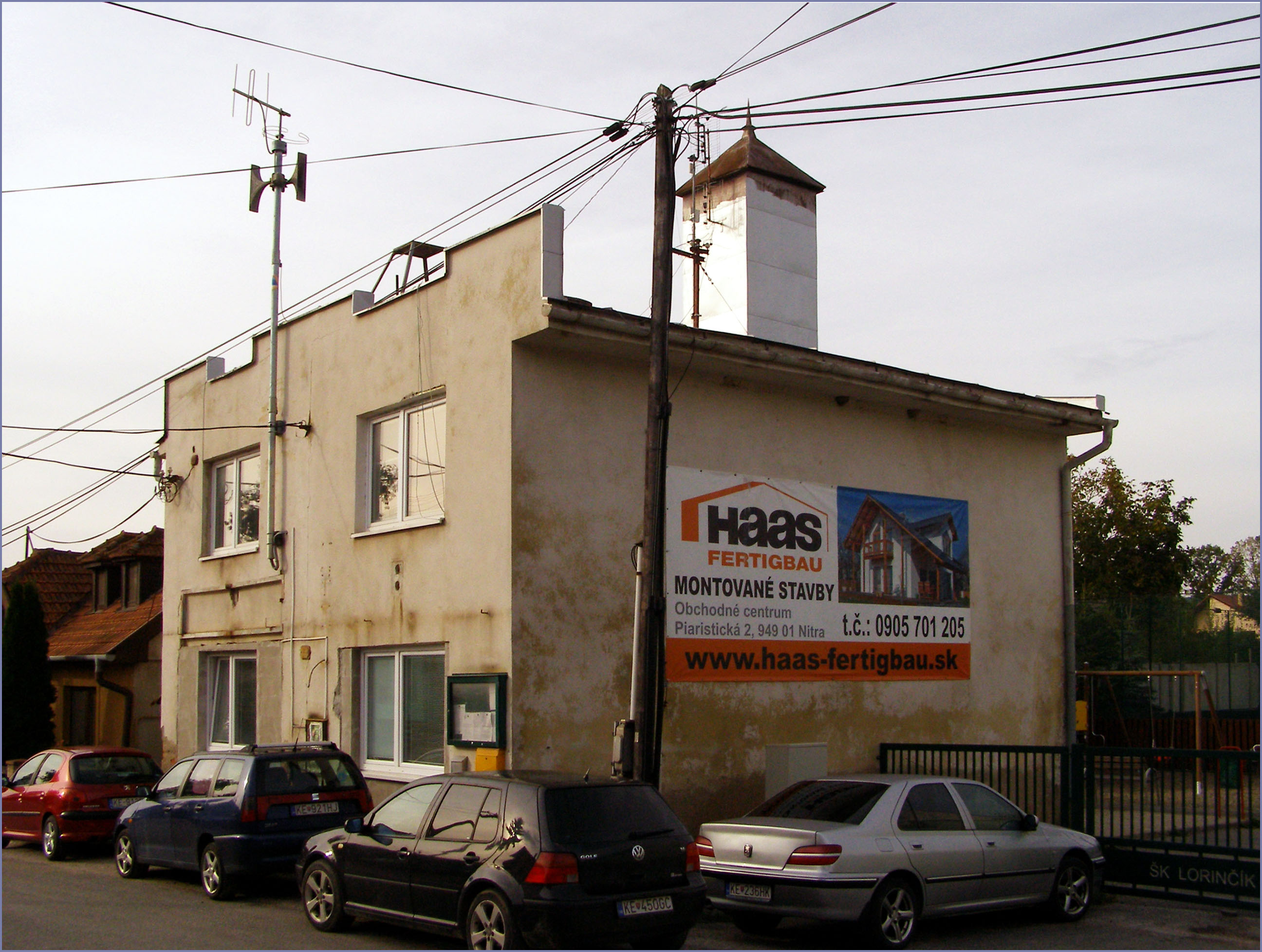
Local fire brigade station

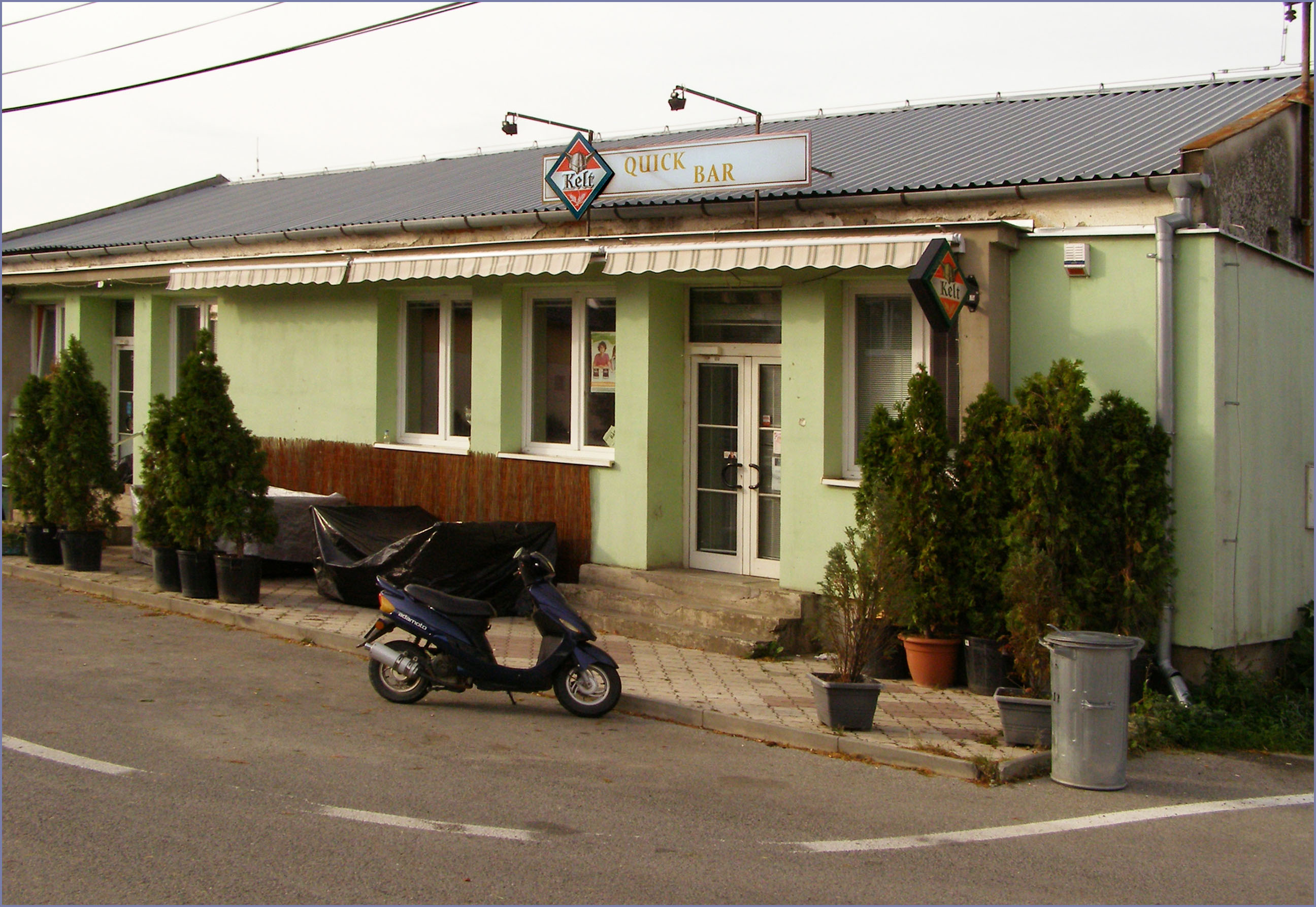
Local pub in Lorinčík

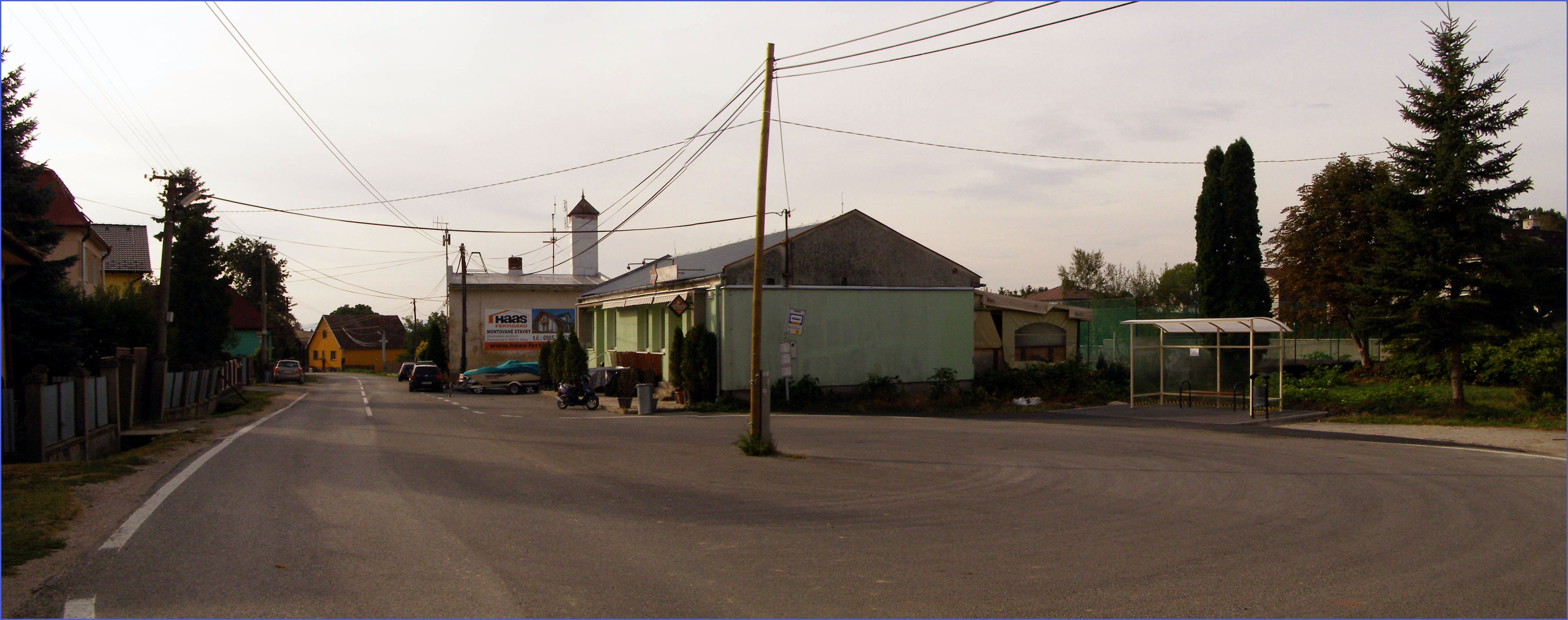
Public bus route terminus
