= Poľov =

Coordinates: 48°40′N 21°12′E

- Borough
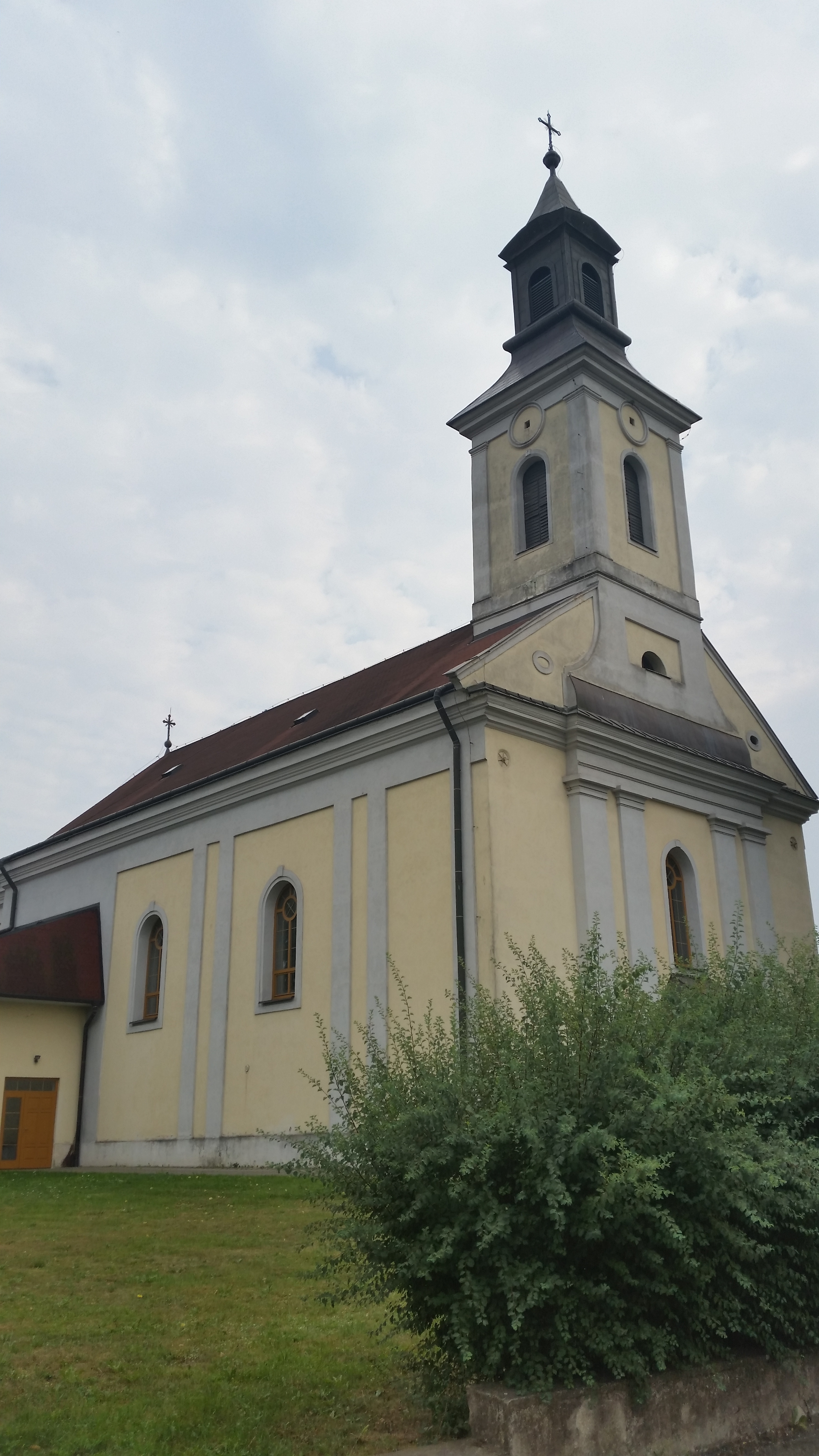
- Church of St Michael the Archangel

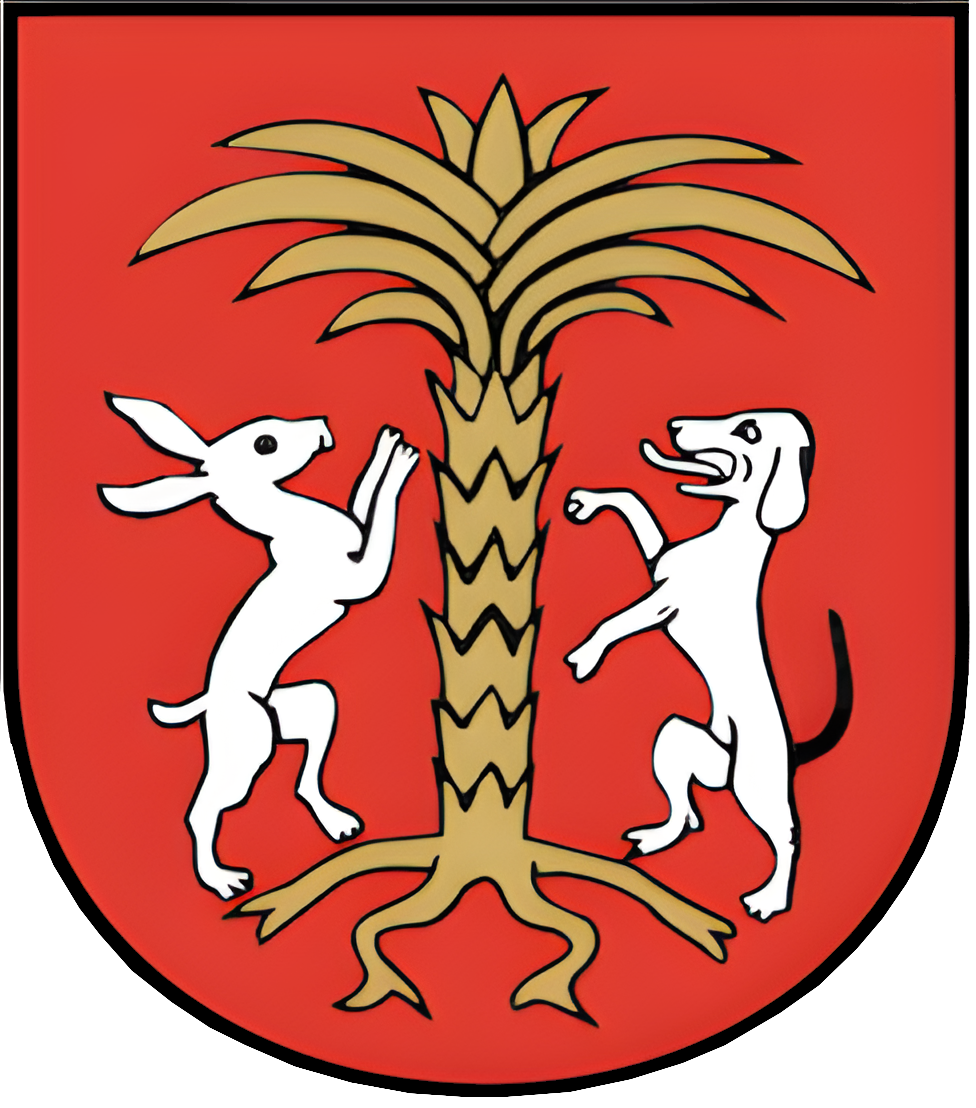
- Flag Coat of arms

- Location within Košice

- Location of Poľov in Slovakia
- Country: Slovakia
- Region: Košice
- District: Košice II
- Village: 1248 (first known record)

Area
  - Total: 12.20 km^{2} (4.71 sq mi)
- Elevation: 275 m (902 ft)

Population (2025)
  - Total: 1,196
- Time zone: UTC+1 (CET)
  - Summer (DST): UTC+2 (CEST)
- Postal code: 040 15
- Area code: +421-55
- Vehicle registration plate (until 2022): KE
- Website: www.mcpolov.sk

Poľov (Hungarian: Pólyi) is a borough (city ward) of the city of Košice, Slovakia. Located in the Košice II district, it lies at an altitude of roughly 275 metres (902 ft) above sea level, and is home to nearly 1,200 people. The borough retains much of its rural character.

== History ==
The first written record of Poľov dates back to 1248.

In the 20th century, Poľov lost village municipality status and was annexed to Košice as one of its boroughs.

== Statistics ==
- Area: 12.96 square kilometres (5.00 sq mi)
- Population: 1,198 (December 2017)
- Density of population: 92/km^{2} (December 2017)
- District: Košice II
- Mayor: Ladislav Brada (as of 2018 elections)

== Geography ==
The municipality lies at an altitude of 275 metres (902 ft) and covers an area of 12.20 km^{2} (4.71 sq mi) (2025).

== Population ==
Population statistic (10 years)
Year	1995	2005	2015	2025
Count	0	1100	1152	1196
Difference		–	+4.72%	+3.81%

Population statistic
Year	2024	2025
Count	1188	1196
Difference		+0.67%

It has a population of 1196 people (31 December 2025).

=== Ethnicity ===
Census 2021 (1+ %)
Ethnicity	Number	Fraction
Slovak	1156	96.97%
Not found out	35	2.93%
Total	1192	

In year 2021 was 1192 people by ethnicity 1156 as Slovak, 35 as Not found out, 7 as Other, 6 as Rusyn, 4 as Romani, 4 as Hungarian, 3 as Czech, 2 as Ukrainian and 2 as Polish.

Note on population: The difference values of population numbers in the table "Population statistic" and in the sections "Ethnicity" & "Religion" is caused by the use of various statistical methods.

=== Religion ===
Census 2021 (1+ %)
Religion	Number	Fraction
Roman Catholic Church	958	80.37%
None	109	9.14%
Not found out	43	3.61%
Greek Catholic Church	24	2.01%
Calvinist Church	15	1.26%
Total	1192	

In year 2021 was 1192 people by religion 958 from Roman Catholic Church, 109 from None, 43 from Not found out, 24 from Greek Catholic Church, 15 from Calvinist Church, 11 from Evangelical Church, 8 from Other, 7 from Apostolic Church, 6 from Eastern Orthodox Church, 3 from Jehovah's Witnesses, 3 from Ad hoc movements, 2 from Other and not ascertained christian church, 1 from Christian Congregations in Slovakia, 1 from Buddhism and 1 from Baptists Church.

== Gallery ==
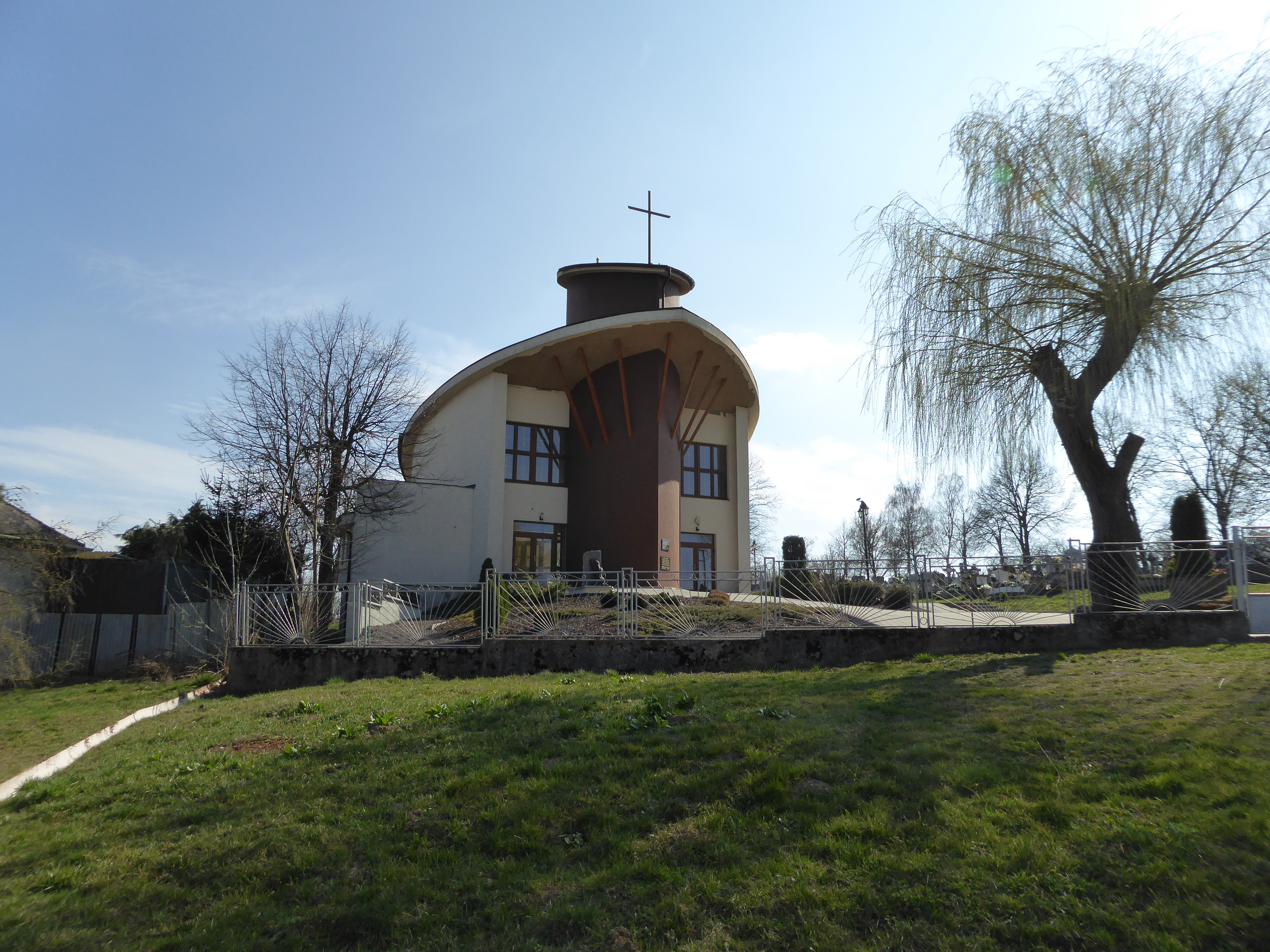
Building at the local cemetery
