= Košice-Barca =

Coordinates: 48°41′N 21°16′E

- Borough
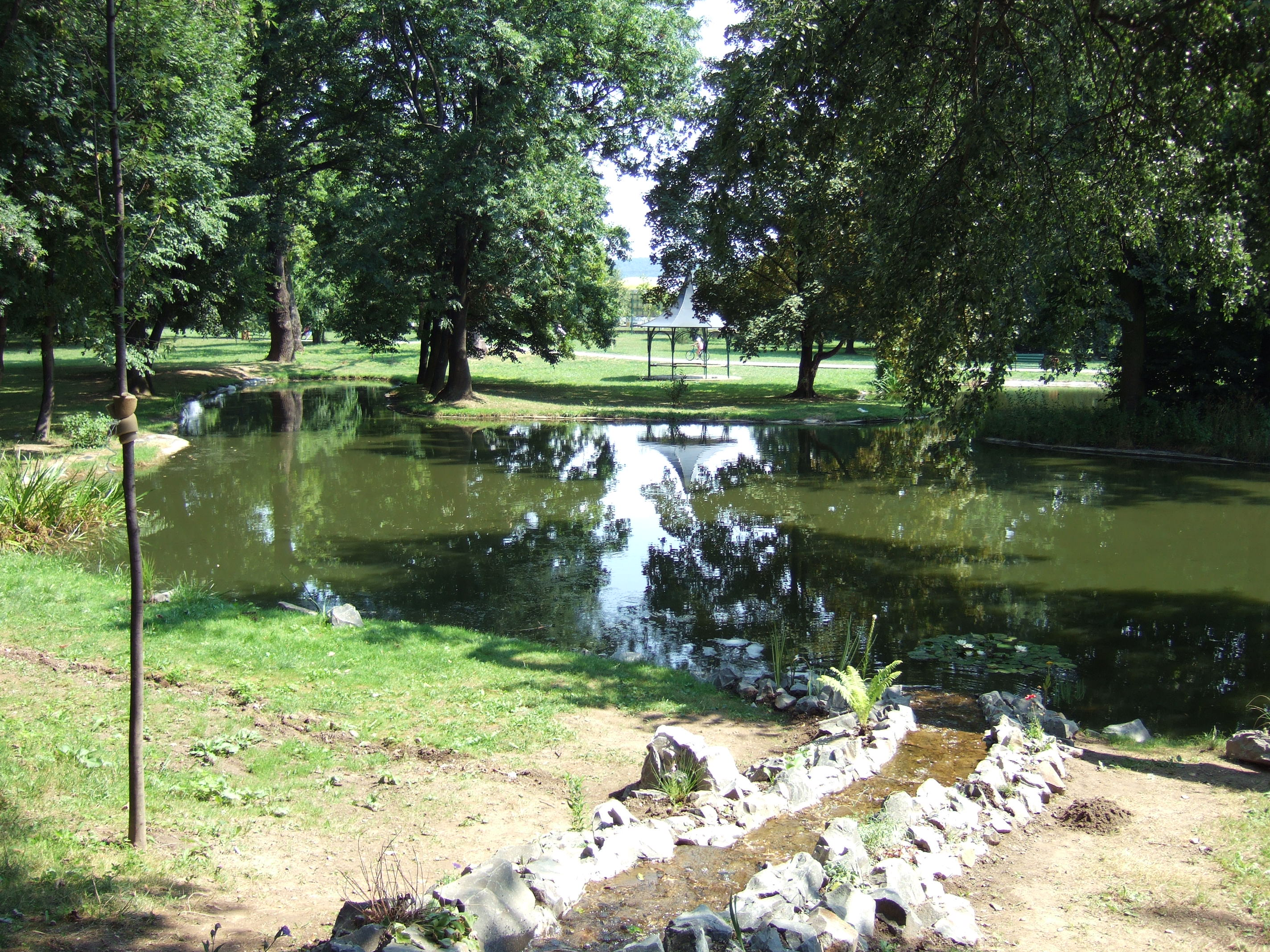
- Protected park with a pond in Barca

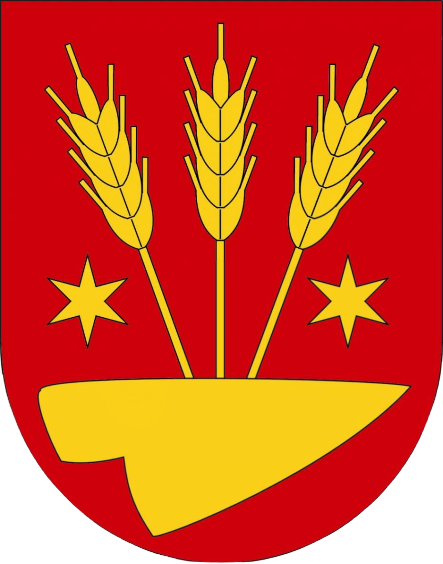
- Flag Coat of arms

- Location within Košice

- Location of Košice-Barca in Slovakia
- Country: Slovakia
- Region: Košice
- District: Košice IV
- Village: 1215 (first known record)

Area
  - Total: 17.96 km^{2} (6.93 sq mi)
- Elevation: 207 m (679 ft)

Population (2025)
  - Total: 3,623
- Time zone: UTC+1 (CET)
  - Summer (DST): UTC+2 (CEST)
- Postal code: 040 17
- Area code: +421-55
- Vehicle registration plate (until 2022): KE
- Website: www.barca.sk

Barca (Hungarian: Bárca) is a borough (city ward) of Košice, Slovakia. Located in the Košice IV district, it lies at an altitude of roughly 210 metres (690 ft) above sea level, and is home to over 3,600 people. The borough is generally rural in nature.

== History ==
It was originally a village in its own right, the first written record about Barca dating back to 1215.

In the latter half of the 20th century, Barca lost village municipality status and was annexed to Košice as one of its boroughs.

One of the principal features within contemporary Barca's catastral territory is Košice International Airport, which is the second largest in Slovakia.

=== Evolution of the borough's name ===
Some of the historical names of Barca.

- 1215 - villa Barca (Latin)
- 1230 - Barca
- 1269 - Barcha
- 1291 - Barchakuzep
- 1297 - villa Barcha
- 1299 - Barcha
- 1570 - Bárczá (Hungarian)
- 1773 - Barca (Slovak)

=== Historical landmarks ===
In the medieval period, the village included a small castle of local noblemen, later demolished and replaced by a manor house of the Bárczay noble family. The manor house stands to this day and has undergone restoration works during the 2010s.

Barca has several more former manor houses, specifically the manor house of the Zichy family and the Berzeviczi family manor house.

The main churches of the borough are the Roman Catholic Church of St Peter and St Paul and the local Reformed church.

== Statistics ==
- Area: 18.13 square kilometres (7.00 sq mi)
- Population: 3,626 (31 December 2017)
- Density of population: 200/km² (31 December 2017)
- District: Košice IV
- Mayor: František Krištof (as of 2018 elections)

== Geography ==
The municipality lies at an altitude of 207 metres (679 ft) and covers an area of 17.96 km^{2} (6.93 sq mi) (2025).

== Population ==
Population statistic (10 years)
Year	1995	2005	2015	2025
Count	0	3233	3502	3623
Difference		–	+8.32%	+3.45%

Population statistic
Year	2024	2025
Count	3656	3623
Difference		−0.90%

It has a population of 3623 people (31 December 2025).

=== Ethnicity ===
Census 2021 (1+ %)
Ethnicity	Number	Fraction
Slovak	3458	93.66%
Not found out	149	4.03%
Hungarian	71	1.92%
Rusyn	50	1.35%
Czech	38	1.02%
Vietnamese	38	1.02%
Total	3692	

In year 2021 was 3692 people by ethnicity 3458 as Slovak, 149 as Not found out, 71 as Hungarian, 50 as Rusyn, 38 as Czech, 38 as Vietnamese, 13 as Other, 7 as German, 5 as Jewish, 4 as Russian, 3 as Ukrainian, 3 as Polish, 3 as Canadian, 2 as Romani, 2 as Greek, 2 as Albanian, 1 as French and 1 as English.

Note on population: The difference values of population numbers in the table "Population statistic" and in the sections "Ethnicity" & "Religion" is caused by the use of various statistical methods.

=== Religion ===
Census 2021 (1+ %)
Religion	Number	Fraction
Roman Catholic Church	2301	62.32%
None	796	21.56%
Greek Catholic Church	165	4.47%
Not found out	150	4.06%
Evangelical Church	116	3.14%
Calvinist Church	60	1.63%
Total	3692	

In year 2021 was 3692 people by religion 2301 from Roman Catholic Church, 796 from None, 165 from Greek Catholic Church, 150 from Not found out, 116 from Evangelical Church, 60 from Calvinist Church, 23 from Buddhism, 16 from Other, 13 from Ad hoc movements, 12 from Eastern Orthodox Church, 12 from Christian Congregations in Slovakia, 10 from Jehovah's Witnesses, 6 from Apostolic Church, 3 from Church of the Brethren, 2 from Jewish community, 2 from Other and not ascertained christian church, 1 from Paganism and natural spirituality, 1 from Islam, 1 from United Methodist Church, 1 from Czechoslovak Hussite Church and 1 from Seventh-day Adventist Church.

== Gallery ==
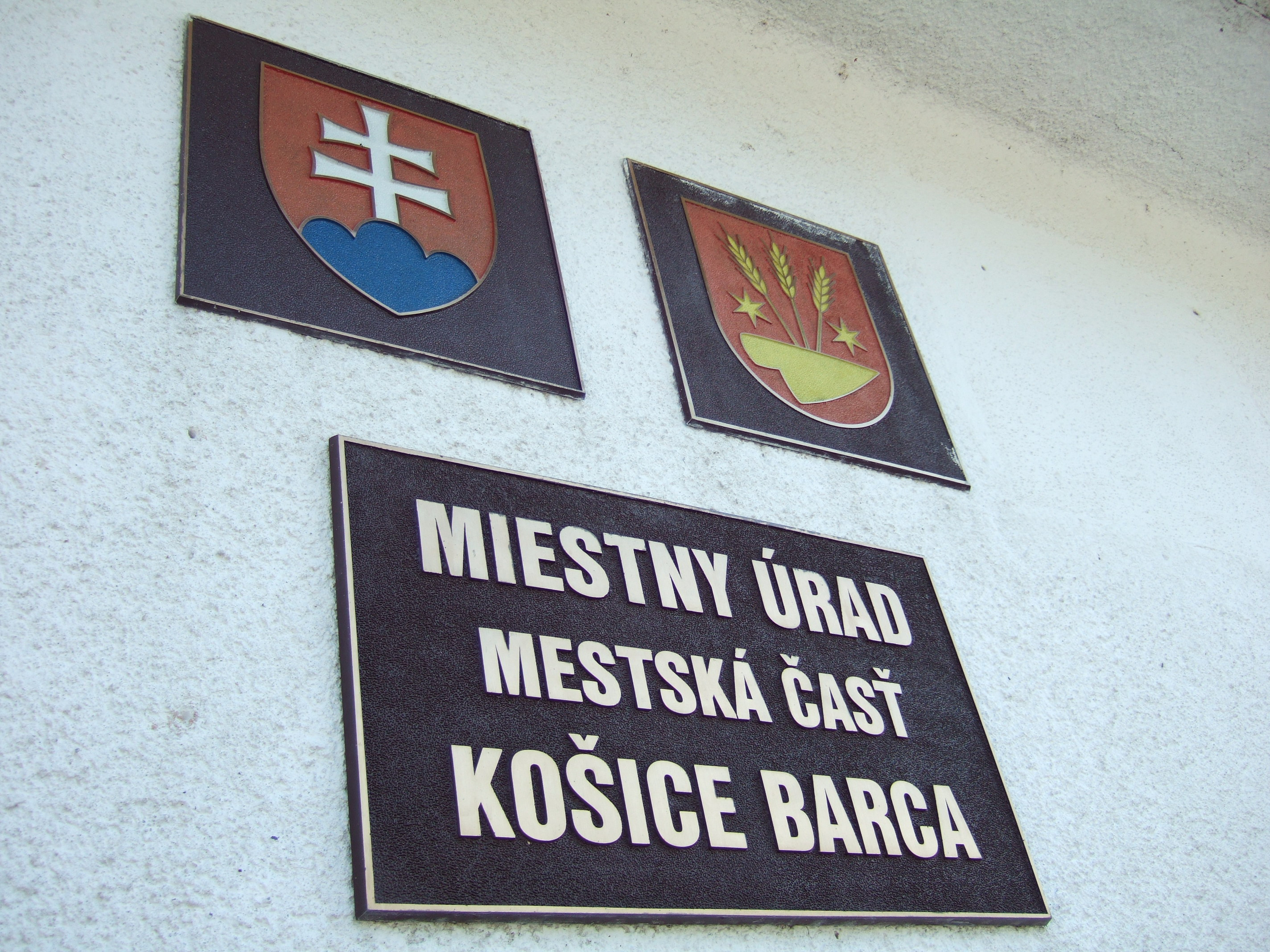
Signs of the municipal office in Košice-Barca

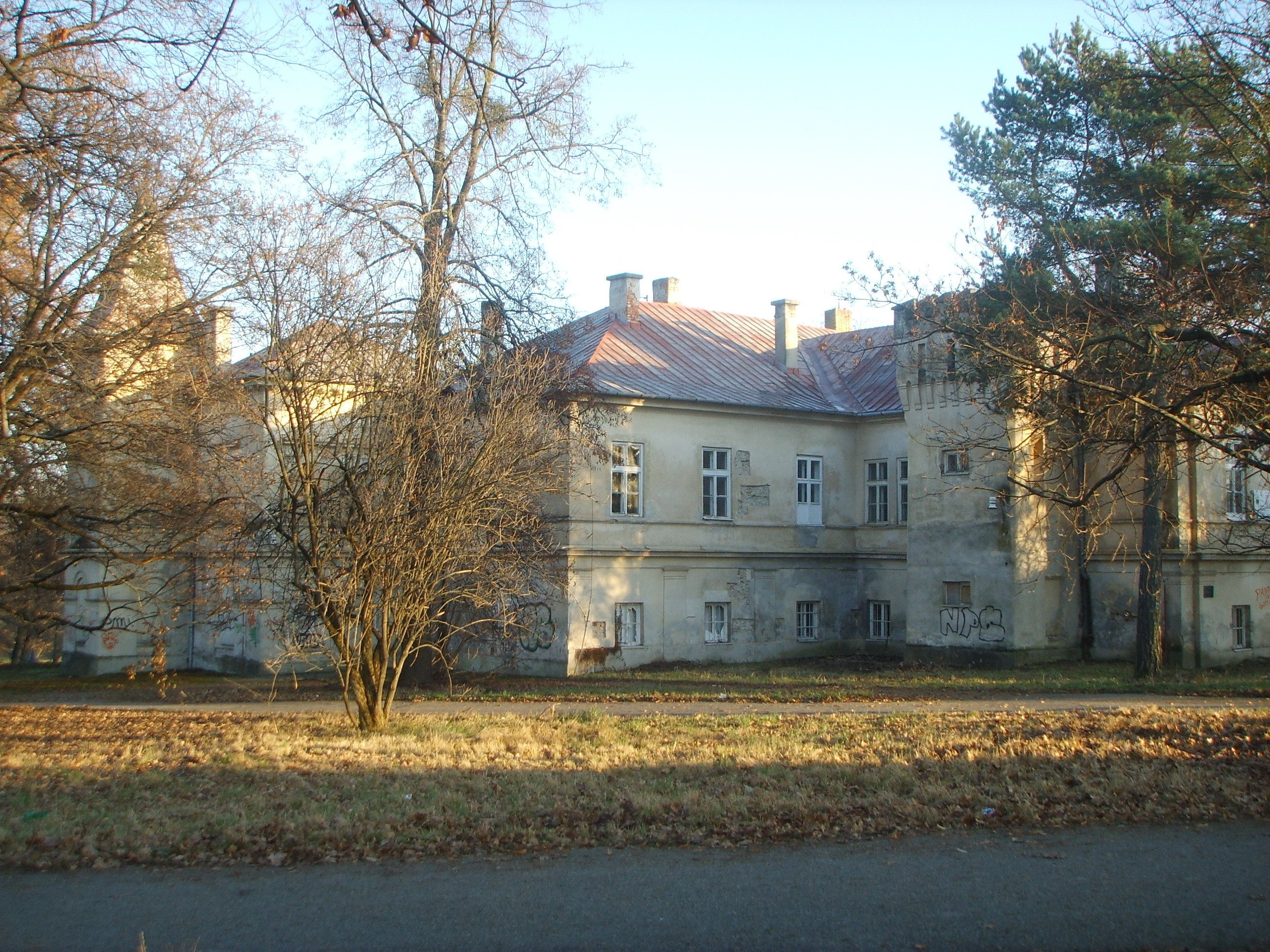
Bárczay family manor house in the Barca borough (built on the site of a former castle)

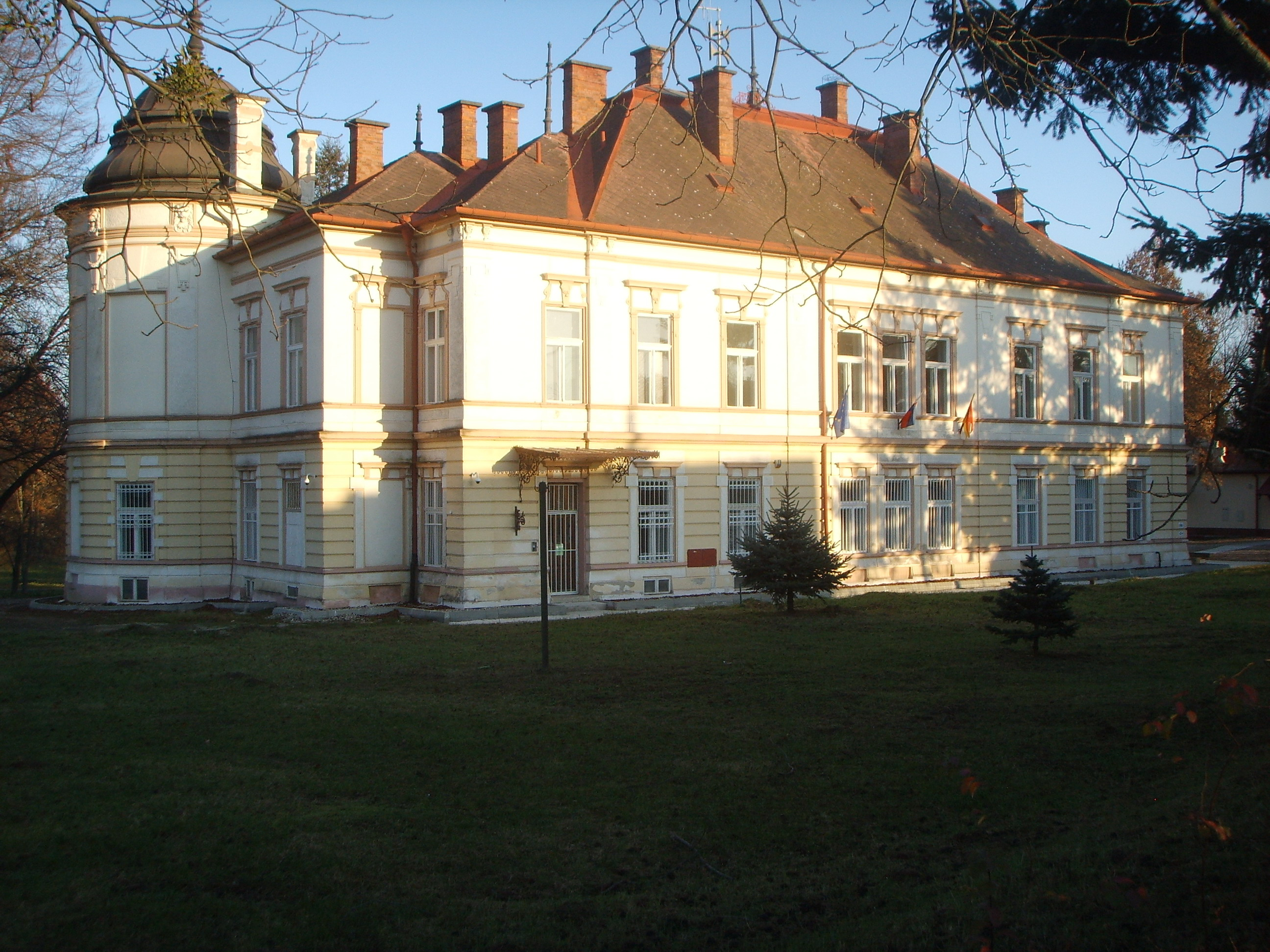
Zichy family manor house

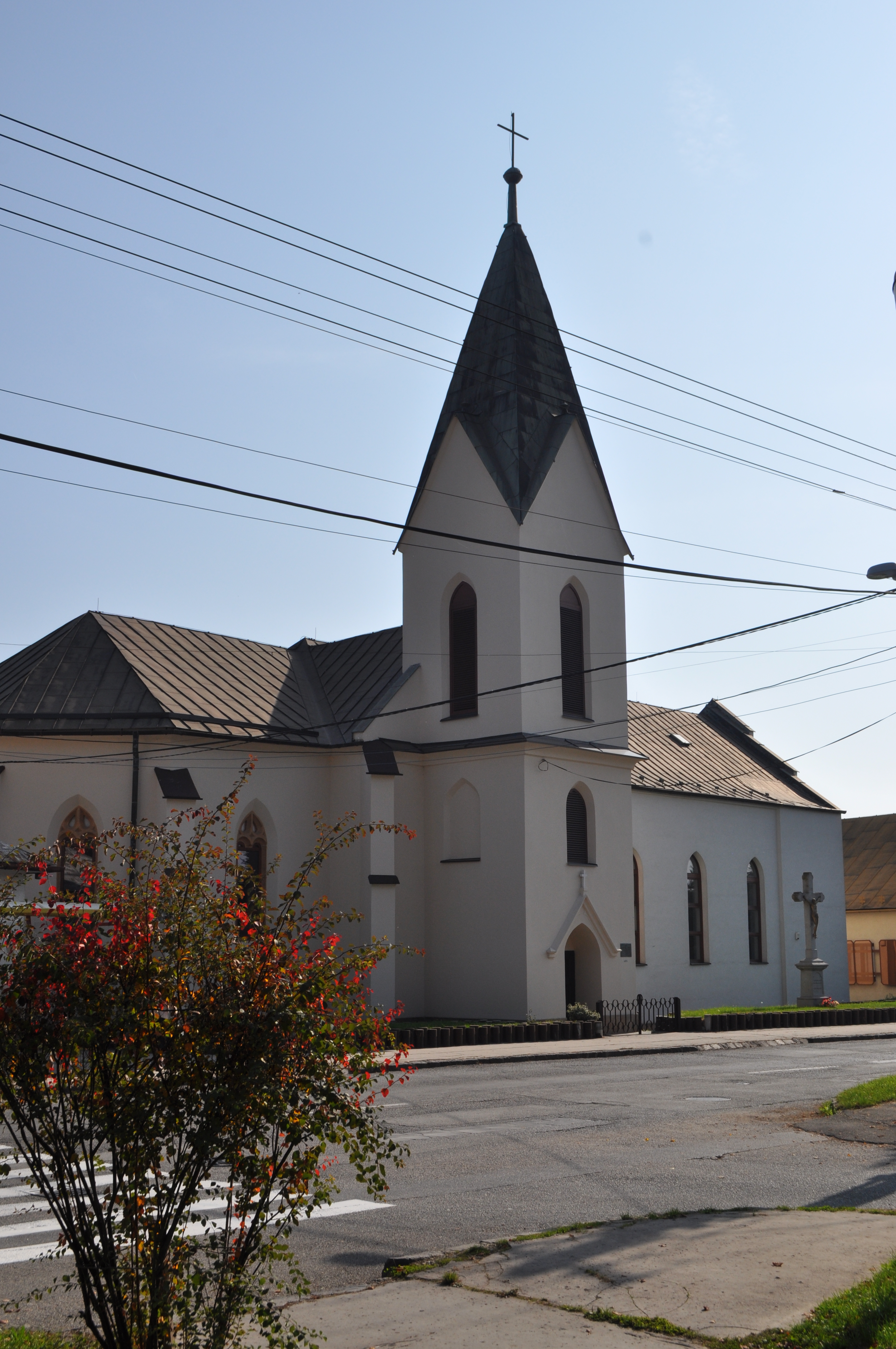
Roman Catholic Church of St Peter and St Paul in the Barca borough

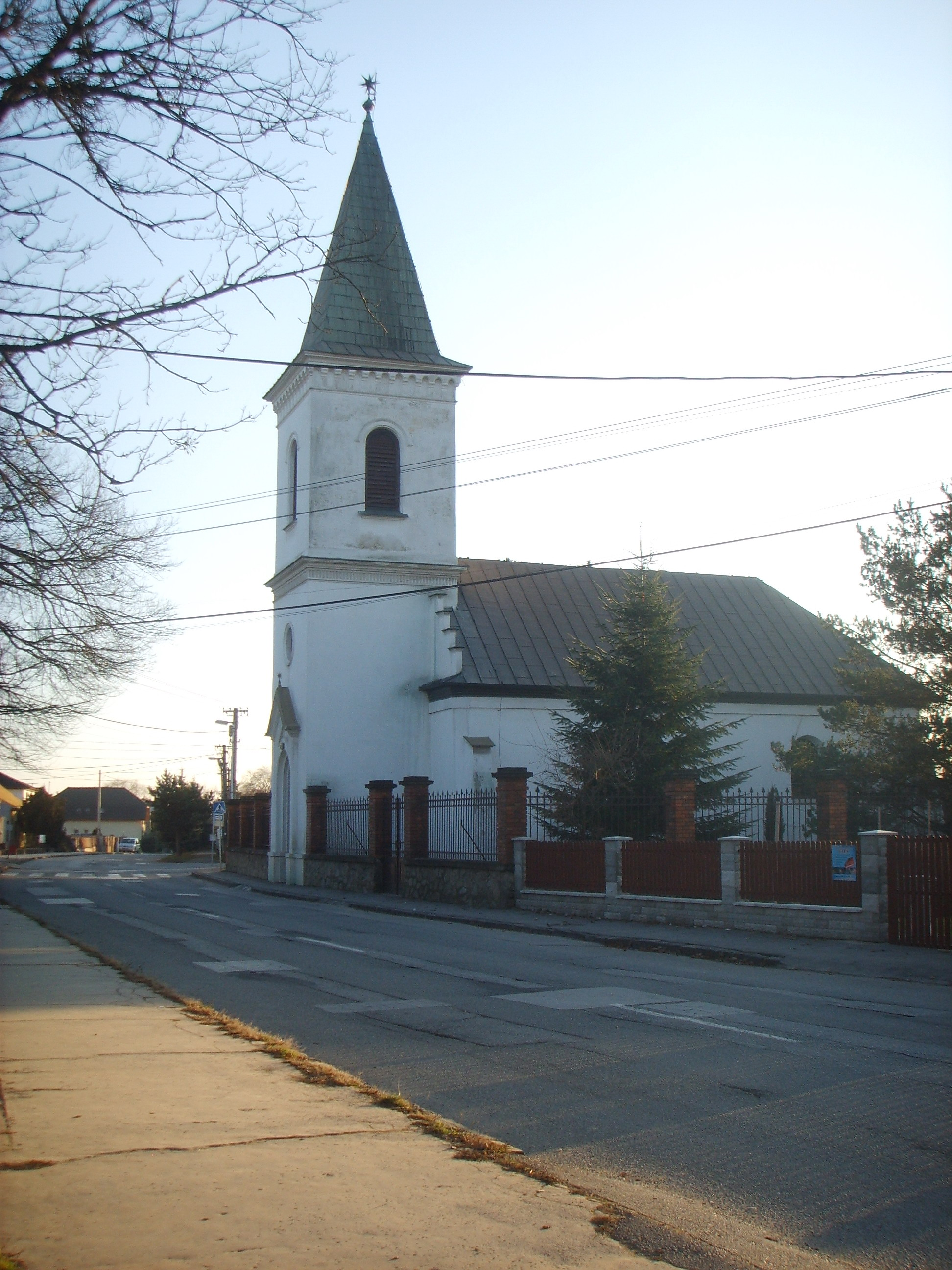
Reformed church in the Barca borough

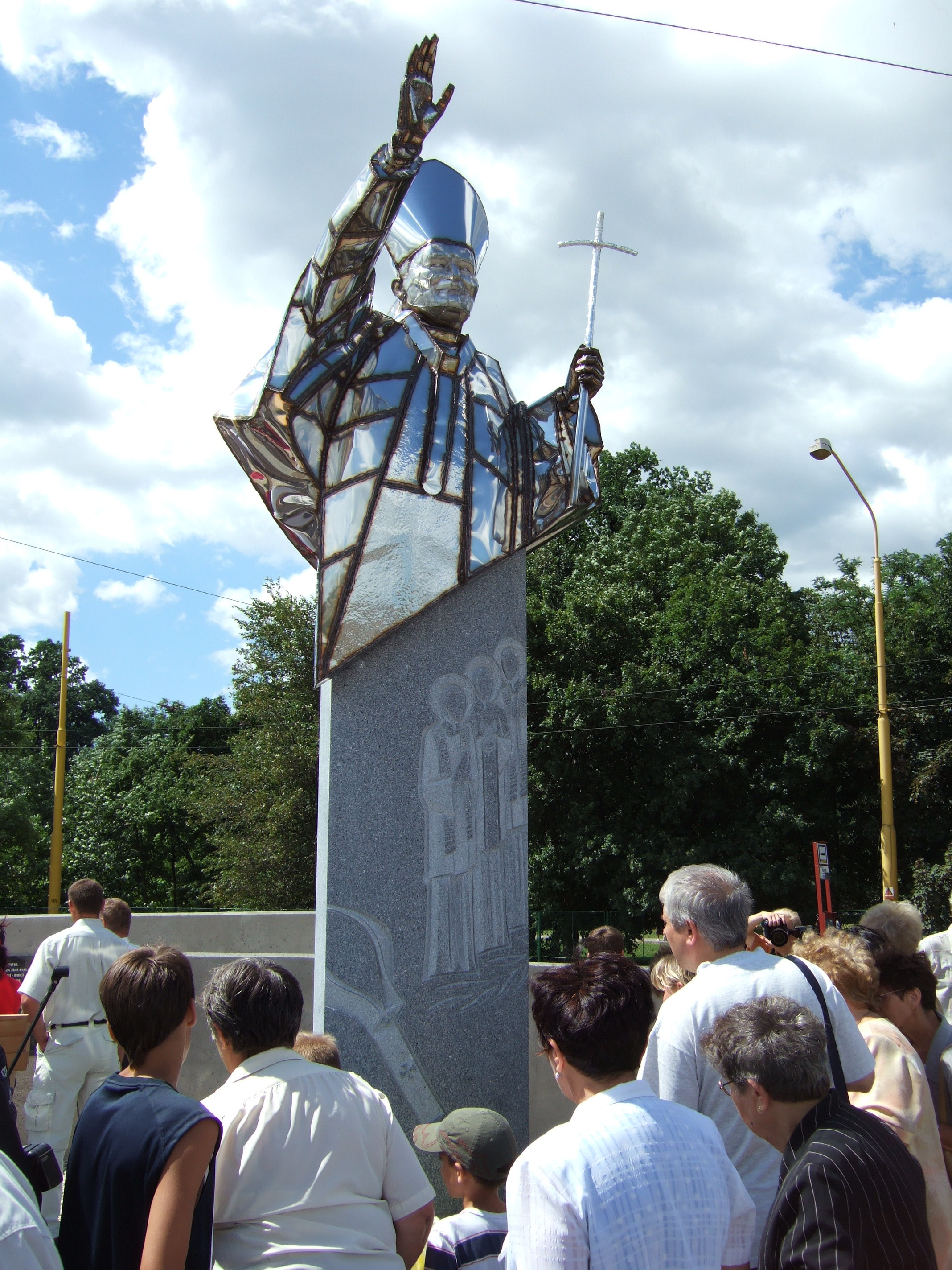
Statue of Pope John Paul II in Barca, unveiled in 2006

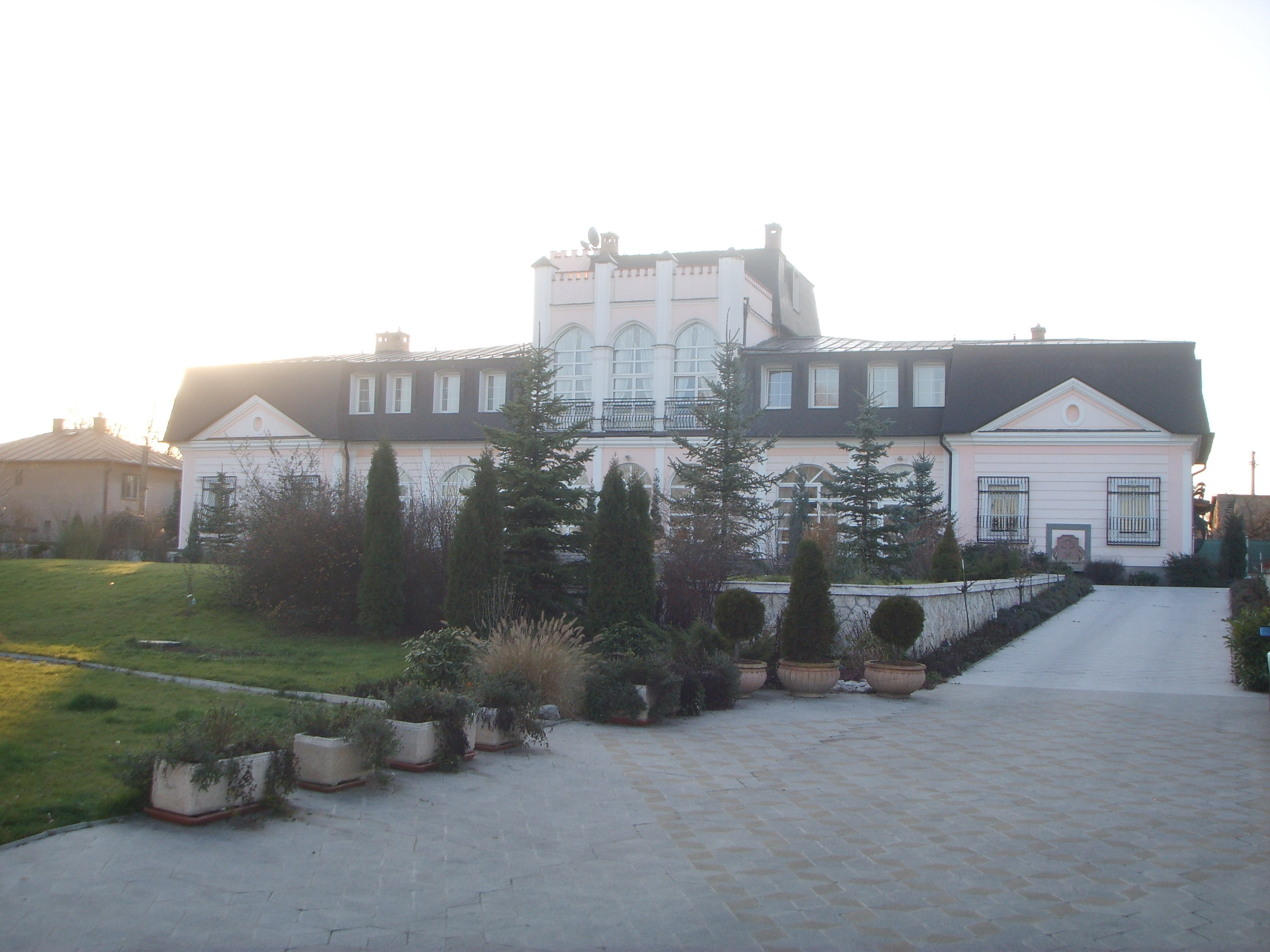
Berzeviczi manor house on Abovská Street
