= Ťahanovce =

Coordinates: 48°45′N 21°15′E

- Borough
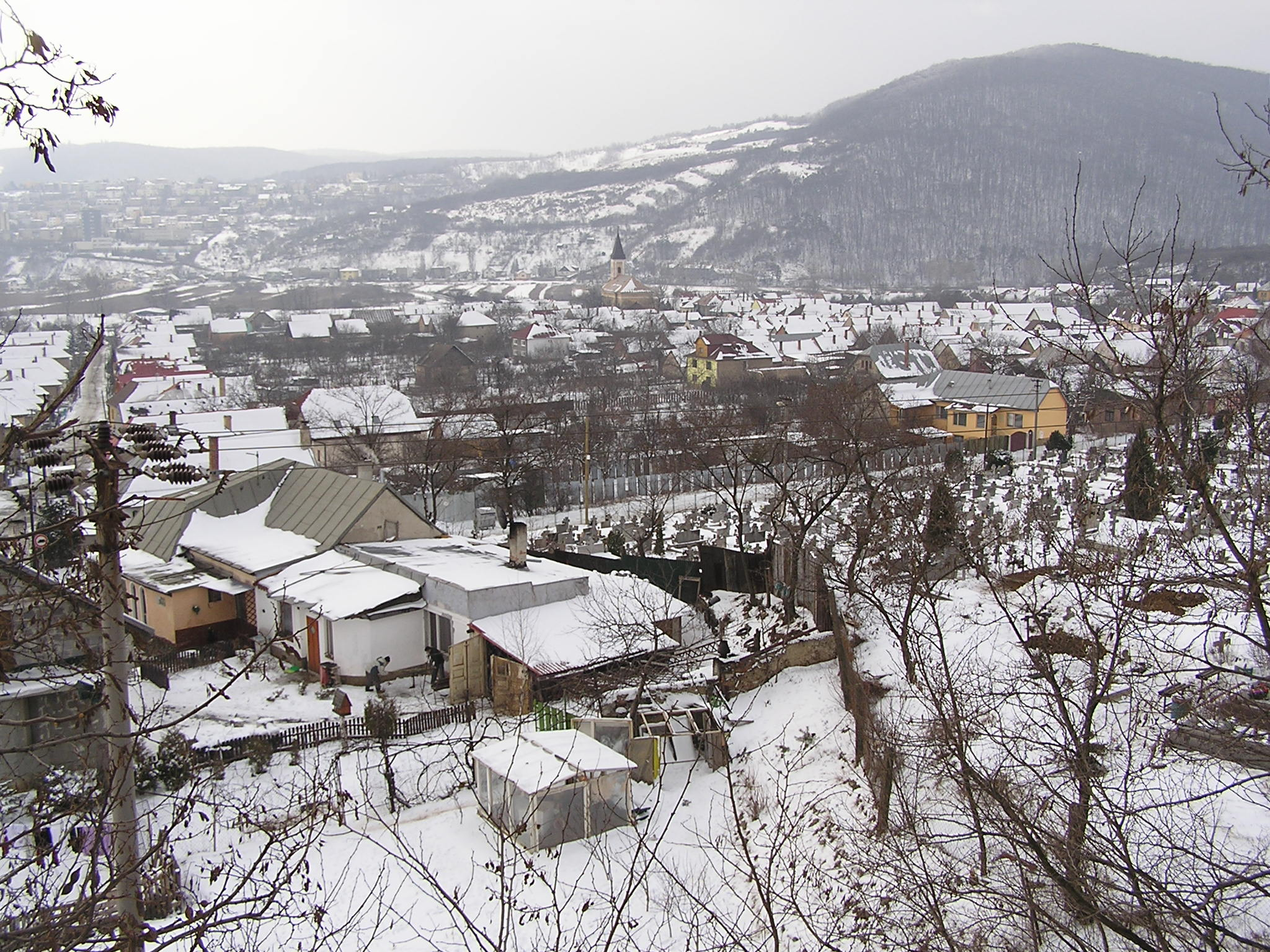
- Overall view of Ťahanovce (February 2006)

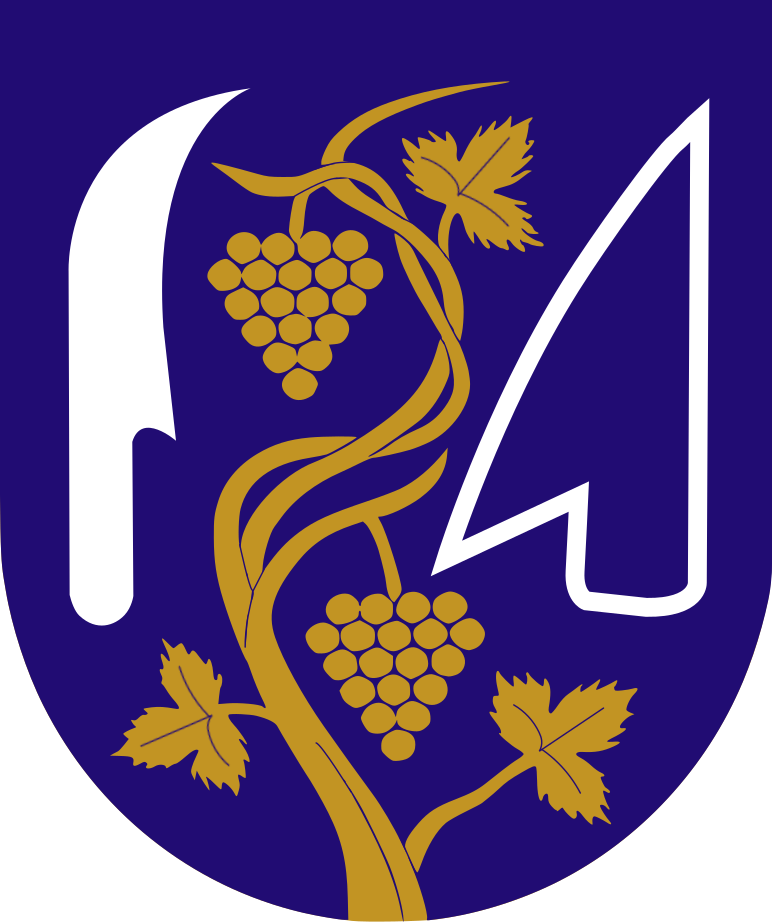
- Flag Coat of arms

- Location within Košice

- Location of Ťahanovce in Slovakia
- Country: Slovakia
- Region: Košice
- District: Košice I
- Village: 1263 (first known record)
- Borough: 1969

Area
  - Total: 7.42 km^{2} (2.86 sq mi)
- Elevation: 221 m (725 ft)

Population (2025)
  - Total: 2,189

Population by ethnicity (2011)
  - Slovak: 76.1%
  - Roma: 2.3%
  - Hungarian: 1%
  - Other: 0.7%
  - Unreported: 19.9%

Population by religion (2011)
  - Roman Catholic: 57.8%
  - Greek Catholic: 3.2%
  - Lutheran: 1.4%
  - Calvinist: 0.4%
  - Orthodox: 0.4%
  - Other: 1.4%
  - Non-religious: 11.5%
  - Unreported: 23.9%
- Time zone: UTC+1 (CET)
  - Summer (DST): UTC+2 (CEST)
- Postal code: 04013
- Area code: +421-55
- Vehicle registration plate (until 2022): KE
- Website: www.tahanovce.eu

Ťahanovce (Hungarian: Hernádtihany, pronounced [ˈhɛrnaːttihɒɲ]) is a borough (city ward) of the city of Košice, Slovakia.

The first written mention about Ťahanovce is dated back to 1263. It was an independent village until 1969 when it was connected with Košice. Ťahanovce is home to approximately 2,000 (prevailingly elder) people and it is closely connected with the city part Sídlisko Ťahanovce.

== Some of the historical names of the village Ťahanovce ==
- 1263 - Latin: predium Tehan (according to name of person)
- 1293 - possesio Thehan
- 1355 - villa Techan
- 1399 - Thehaan
- 1773 - Slovak: Czahanowcze; Hungarian: Téhany
- 1786 - Slovak: Czahanowecz; Hungarian: Téhány
- 1808 - Slovak: Tahanowce; Hungarian: Tehány
- 1863, 1892 - Hungarian: Tihany
- 1873 - Hungarian: Tihány
- 1888 - Hungarian: Abaújtihány
- 1907, 1938 - Hungarian: Hernádtihany
- 1920, 1945 - Slovak: Ťahanovce

== Statistics ==
- Area: 7.28 km² (2016)
- Population: 2 529 (31 December 2017)
- Density of population: 350/km² (December 2017)
- District: Košice I
- Mayor: Ing. Ján Nigut

== Geography ==
The municipality lies at an altitude of 221 metres (725 ft) and covers an area of 7.42 km^{2} (2.86 sq mi) (2025).

== Population ==
Population statistic (10 years)
Year	1995	2005	2015	2025
Count	0	1662	2512	2189
Difference		–	+51.14%	−12.85%

Population statistic
Year	2024	2025
Count	2180	2189
Difference		+0.41%

It has a population of 2189 people (31 December 2025).

=== Ethnicity ===
Census 2021 (1+ %)
Ethnicity	Number	Fraction
Slovak	1935	86.46%
Not found out	252	11.26%
Romani	44	1.96%
Hungarian	33	1.47%
Total	2238	

In year 2021 was 2238 people by ethnicity 1935 as Slovak, 252 as Not found out, 44 as Romani, 33 as Hungarian, 22 as Czech, 14 as Rusyn, 13 as Ukrainian, 8 as Other, 3 as Russian, 2 as Romanian, 1 as Irish and 1 as French.

Note on population: The difference values of population numbers in the table "Population statistic" and in the sections "Ethnicity" & "Religion" is caused by the use of various statistical methods.

=== Religion ===
Census 2021 (1+ %)
Religion	Number	Fraction
Roman Catholic Church	1242	55.5%
None	509	22.74%
Not found out	266	11.89%
Greek Catholic Church	77	3.44%
Evangelical Church	37	1.65%
Eastern Orthodox Church	29	1.3%
Total	2238	

In year 2021 was 2238 people by religion 1242 from Roman Catholic Church, 509 from None, 266 from Not found out, 77 from Greek Catholic Church, 37 from Evangelical Church, 29 from Eastern Orthodox Church, 20 from Calvinist Church, 13 from Apostolic Church, 10 from Ad hoc movements, 8 from Christian Congregations in Slovakia, 6 from Other, 5 from Old Catholic Church, 5 from Other and not ascertained christian church, 3 from Jehovah's Witnesses, 3 from Buddhism, 2 from Seventh-day Adventist Church, 2 from Baptists Church and 1 from Islam.

== Gallery ==
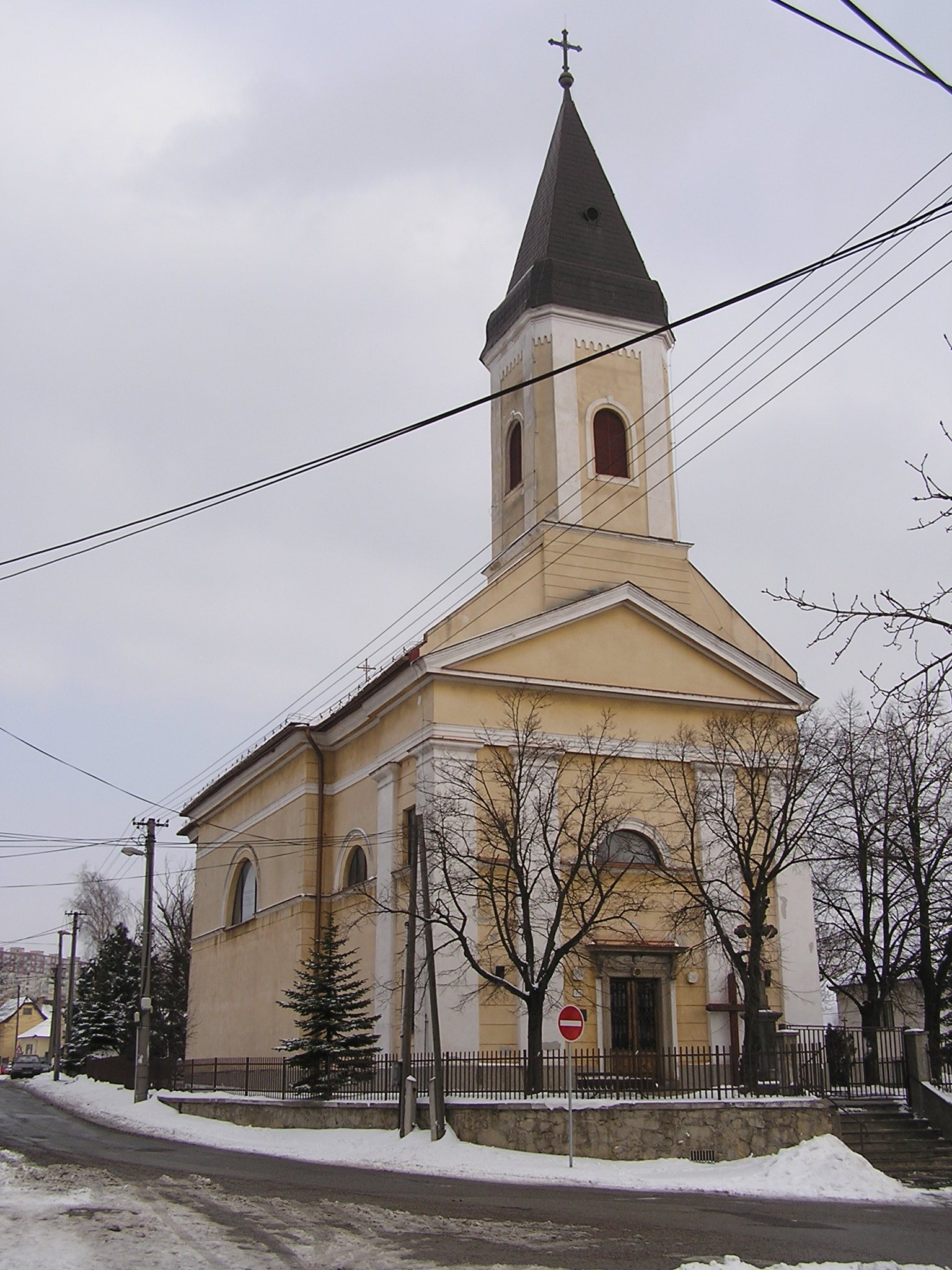
Saint Anne church erected in 1850

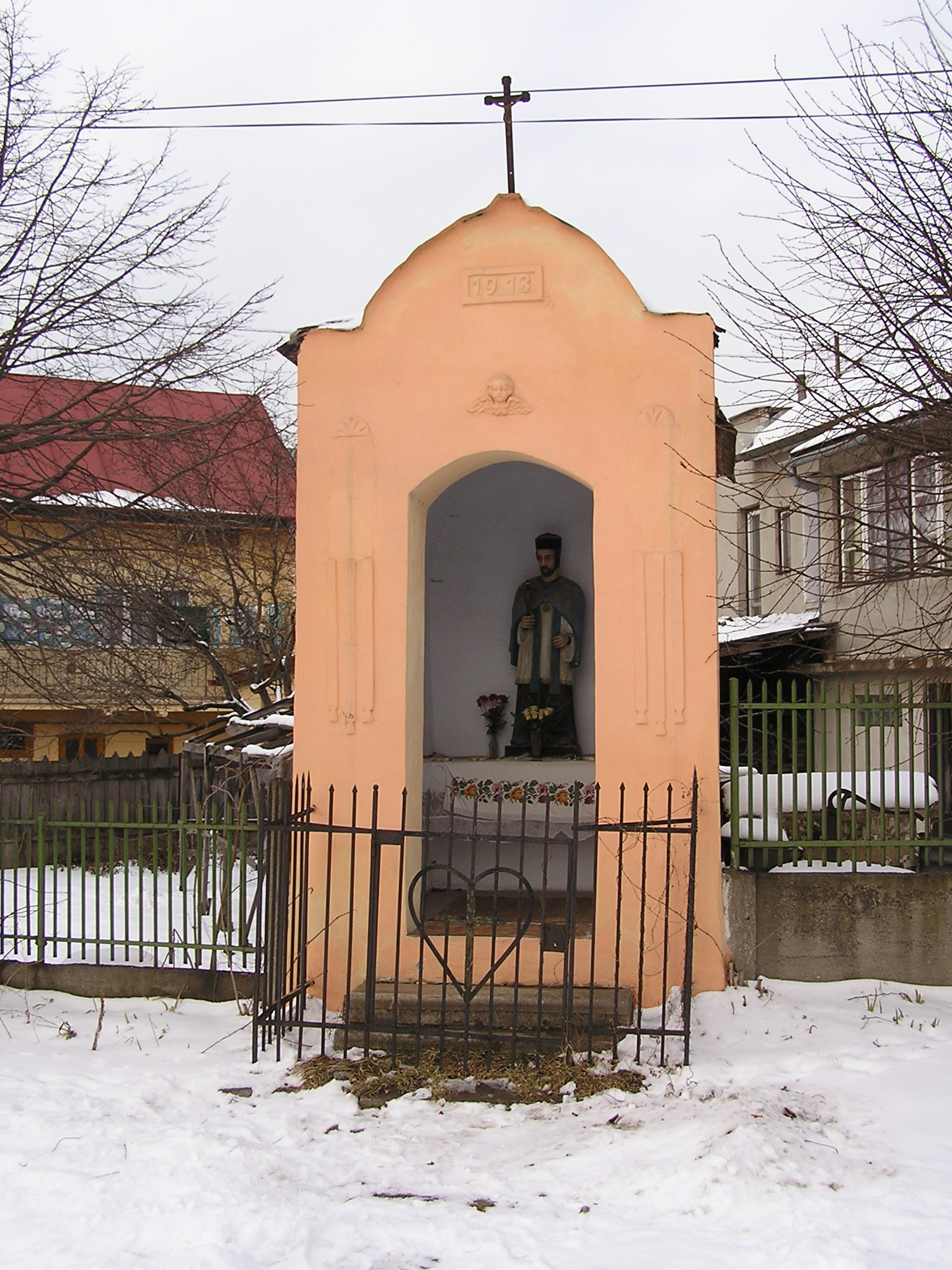
Saint John of Nepomuk´s chapel erected in 1913

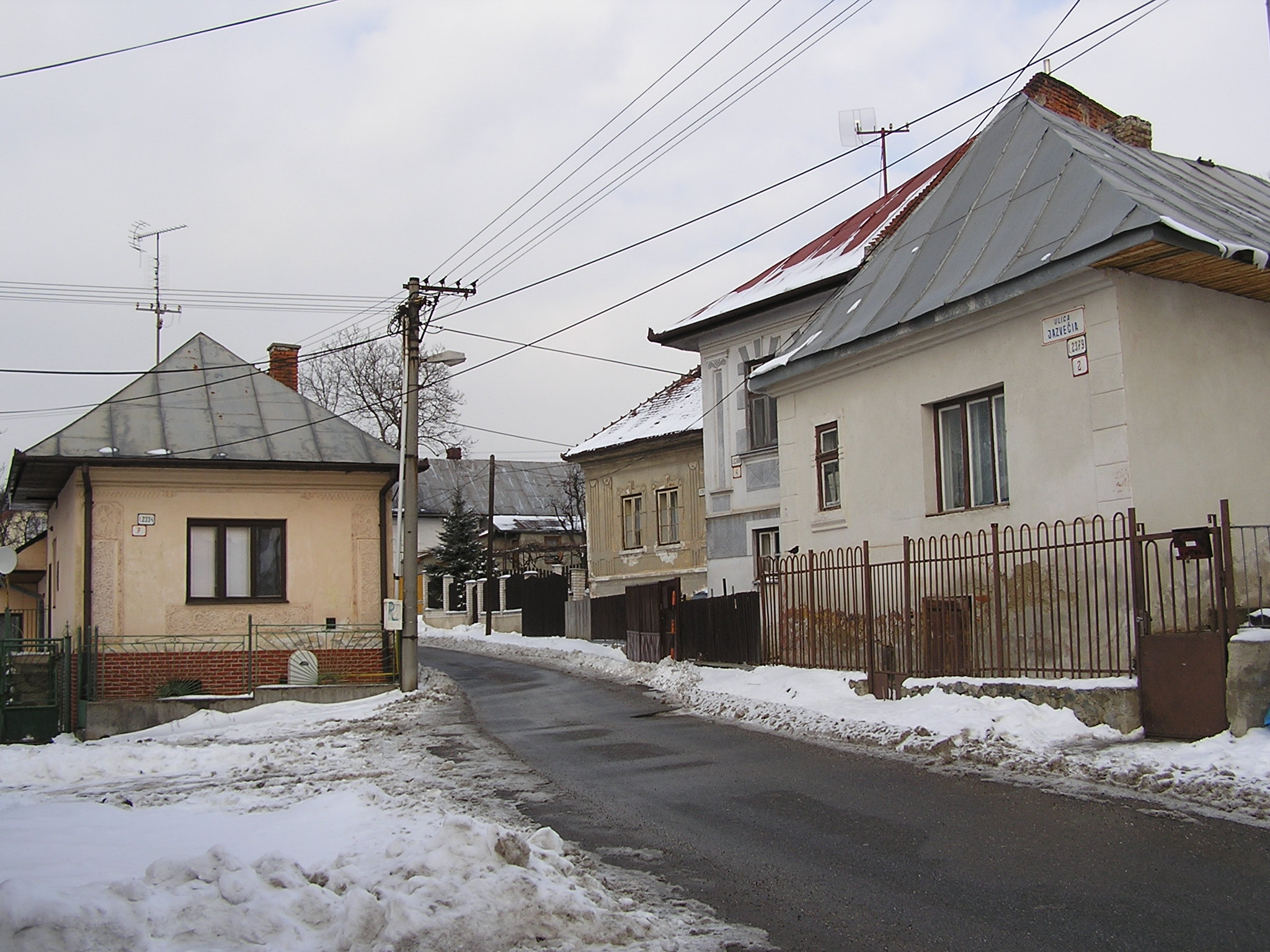
Houses of Ťahanovce

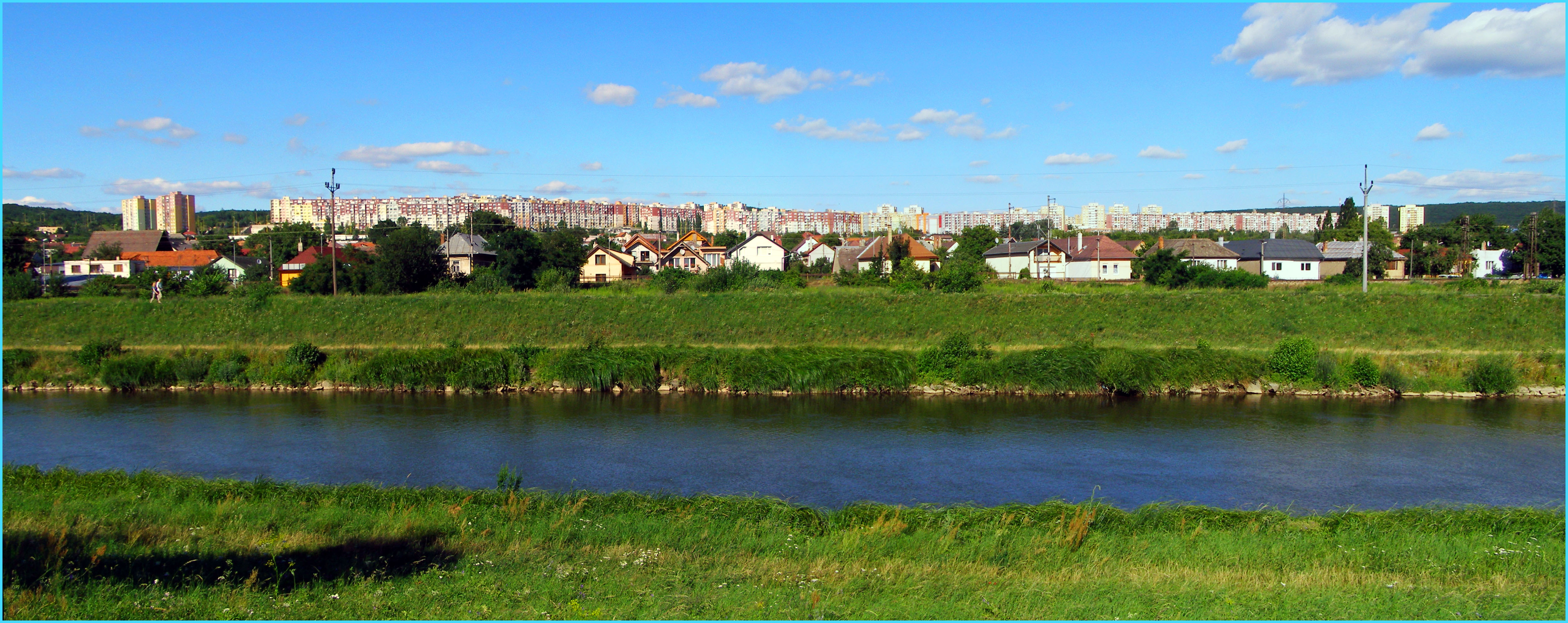
Overall panorama of Ťahanovce and Sídlisko Ťahanovce
