= Košice Zoo =

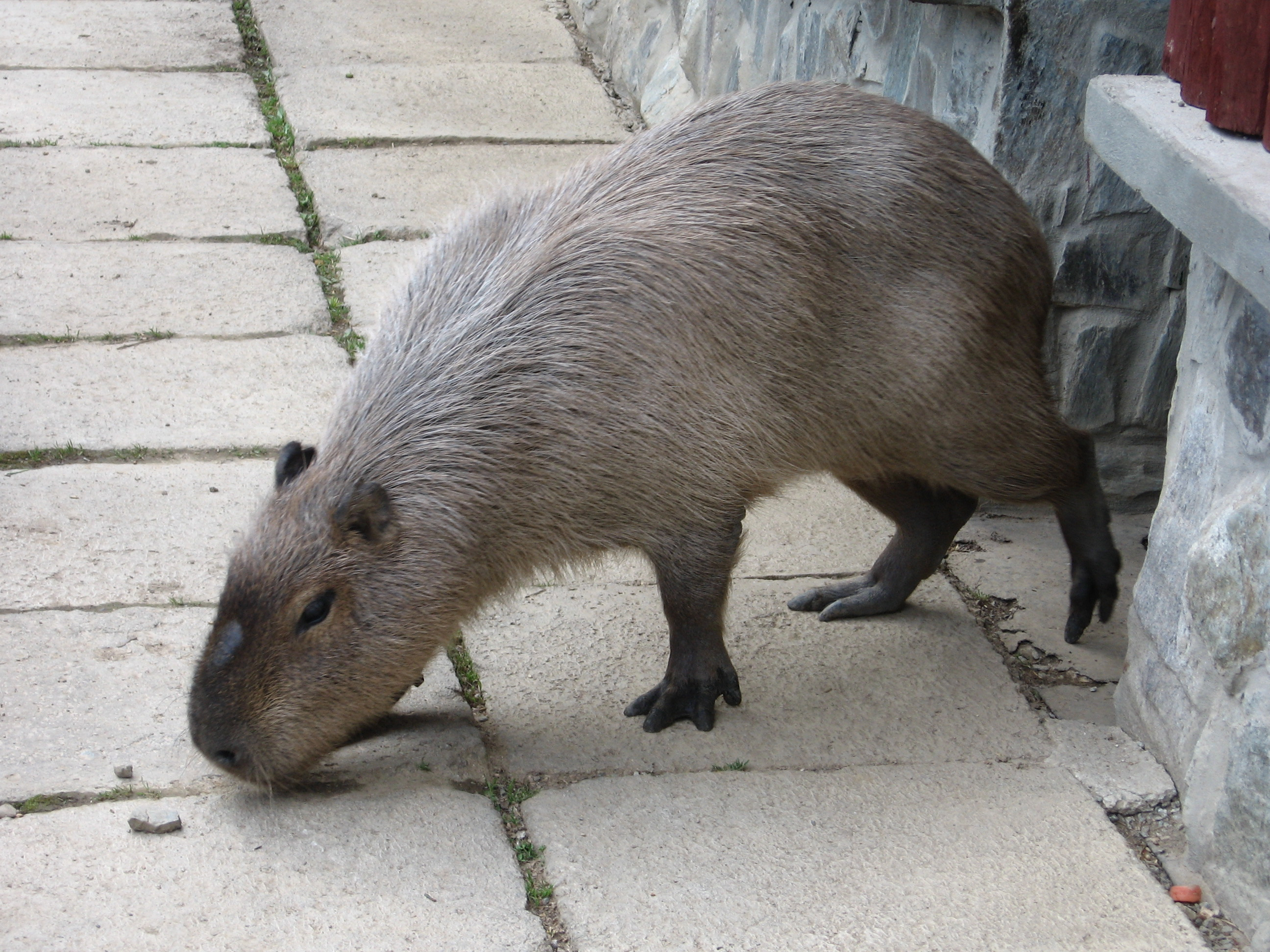
- Capybara in the Košice Zoo
- Interactive map of Košice Zoo
- 48°47′1″N 21°12′14″E
- Date opened: 1979
- Location: Košice, Slovakia
- Land area: 292 ha (720 acres)
- No. of animals: 1200
- No. of species: 280
- Annual visitors: 250,000
- Website: www.zookosice.sk

The Košice Zoo (Slovak: Zoologická záhrada Košice) is a zoo in Košice, Slovakia in the borough of Kavečany. It covers 292 hectares (720 acres) and is the largest zoo in Slovakia and the third largest in Europe. Visitors are allowed in only about one third of the site. Another area outside the visitors area is preserved as the Carpathian Biom, with many wild Slovak species of fauna and flora, including the Imperial Eagle, Black Storc, and Raven. The zoo hosts about 250,000 visitors each year. Inside the zoo is a large Slovak "Jurassic Park" and many educational trails.

== History ==
Construction of the zoo started in 1979. It opened to the public in 1985 with 23 species and an area of 7 hectares (17 acres). A petting zoo opened for children in 2000.

== Animals ==
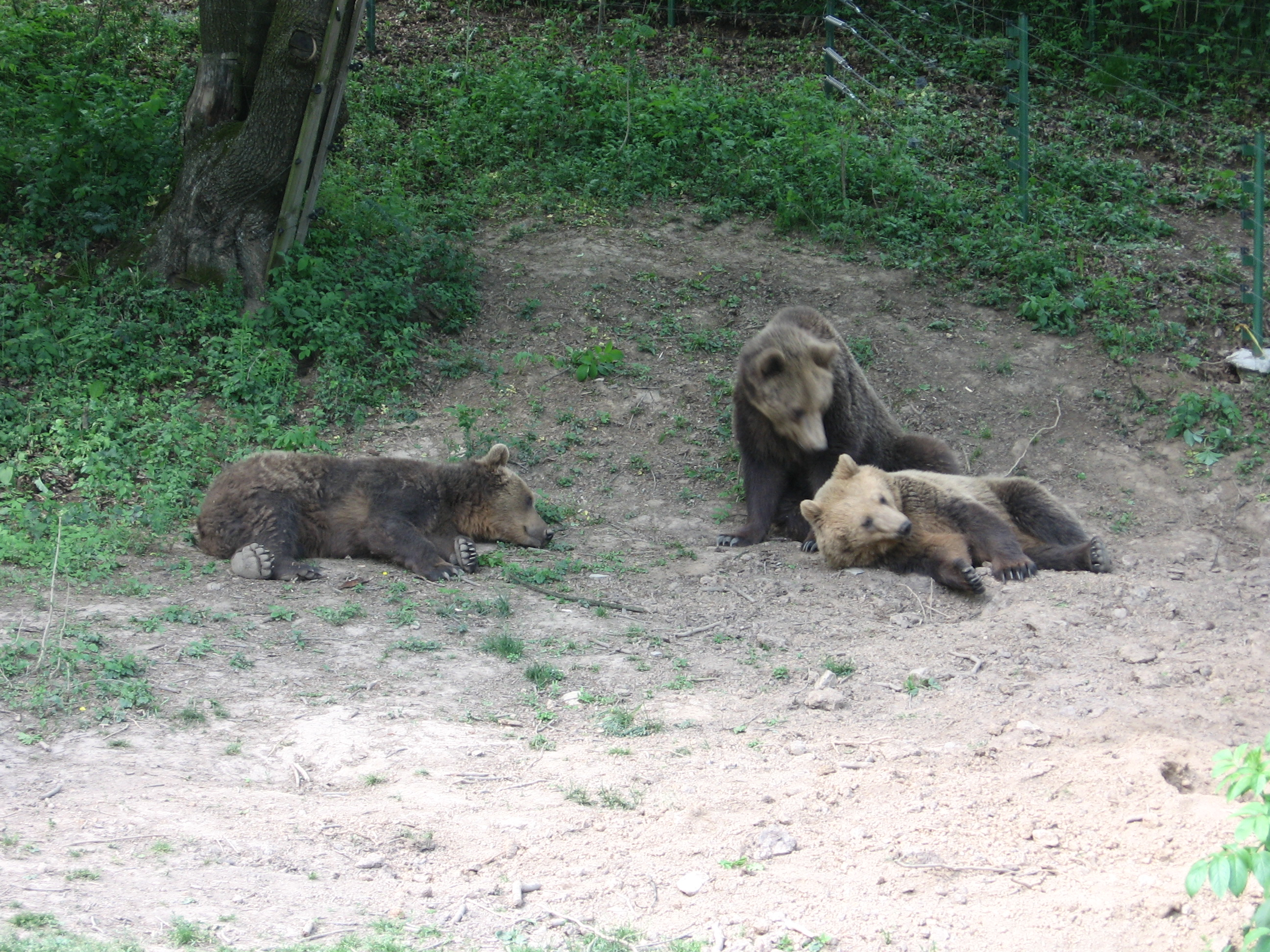
Bears

As of 1 January 2020 the zoo housed the second largest animal collection in Slovakia.

Species bred in the zoo include: Cuban Boa, Humboldt Penguin, Toco toucan, Silvery-checked hornbill, Himalaya Monal pheasants, European Brown Bear (Guinness Book recorded 5 cubs born and reared in one litter in 2002), Przewalski wild horse (3 animals released to wilderness in Mongolia), Blasboock, Kafue red lechwe, Siberian ibex, Alpine Chamois, European Bison, Hutsul horse (protected horse form of Carpathians).

Animals are mostly from Europe and Asia, though the zoo keeps some non-Eurasian species. The zoo has about 1200 animals in 280 species including the brown bear, lynx, emu, parrots, tamarins, turtles, tortoises, zebras, camels, ibexs, horses, antelopes, lions, tigers, european bison.

== Breeding programs ==
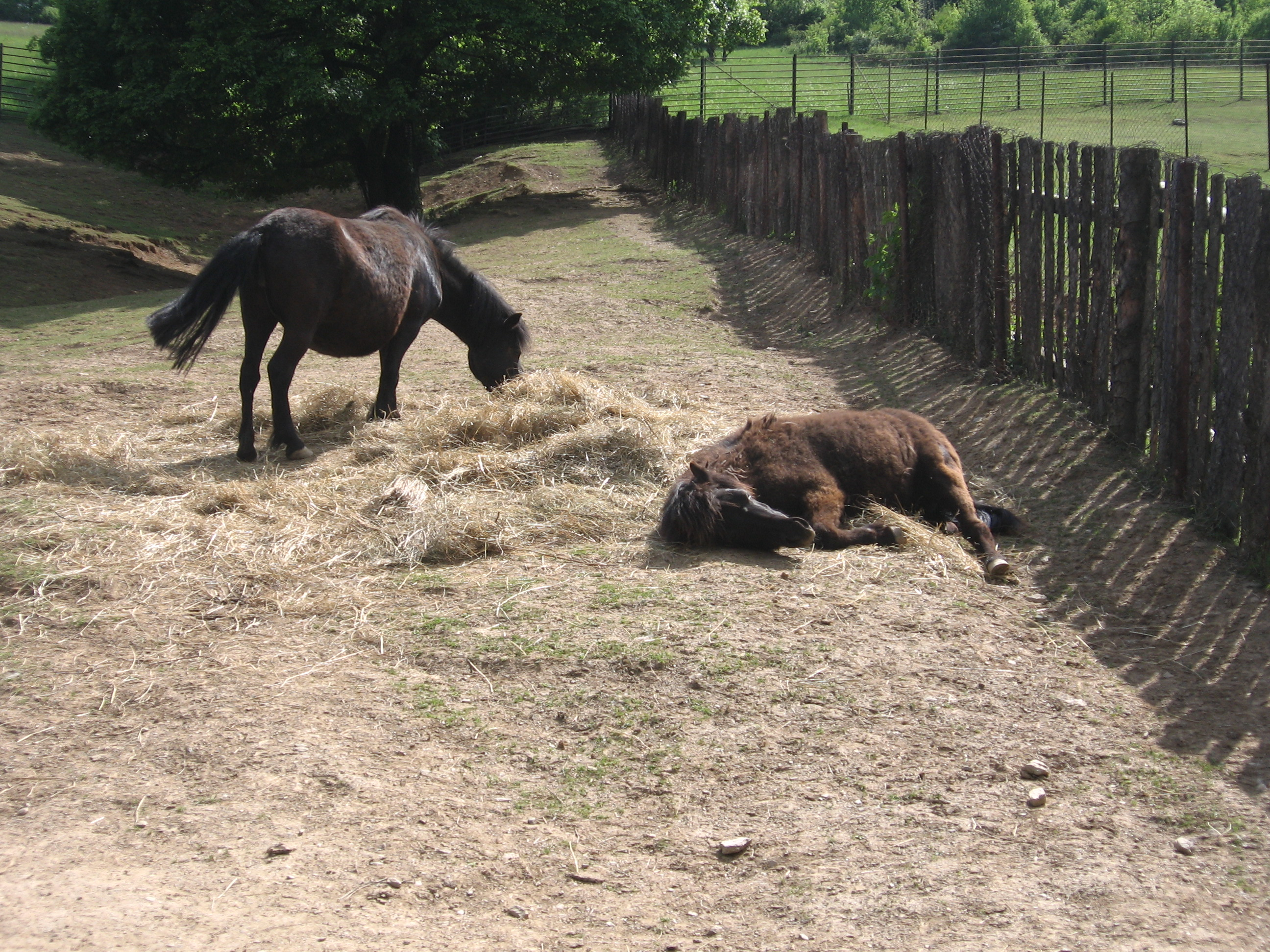
Horses

The zoo breeds the hucul horse, birthing 92 foals. The zoo returns some of its animals to the gene pool of the species beginning in 1996. The zoo includes an 11-hectare (27-acre) off-visitor area for horses to roam.

Other breeding efforts at the zoo include brown bears (a litter of 5 born in 2002 is in the Guinness Book of World Records), baboons, lynx, Przewalski's horses, Shetland ponies, Chapman's zebras, Siberian wapiti, Capybaras, and emus.
