= Sídlisko Ťahanovce =

- Borough
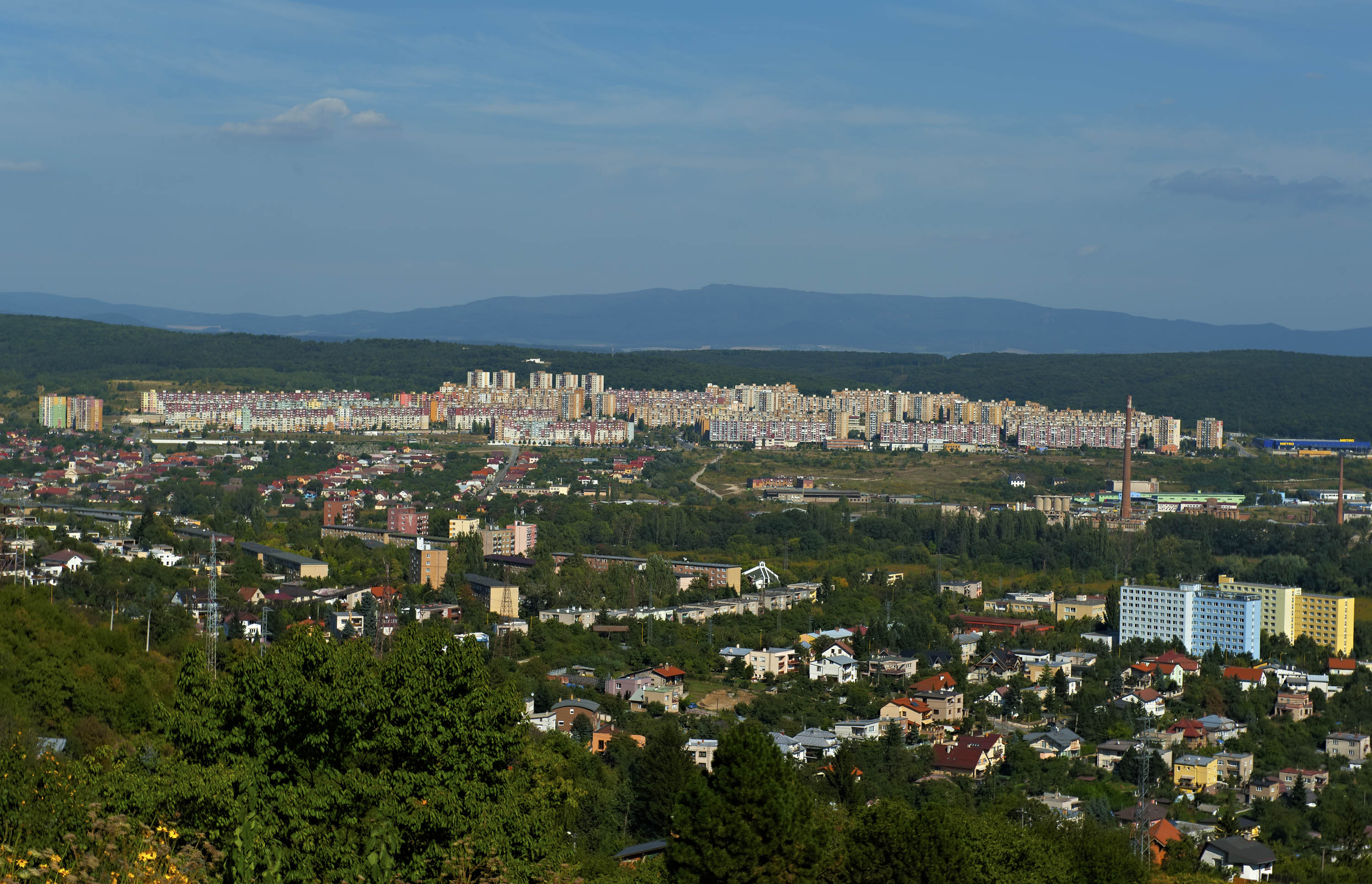
- Sídlisko Ťahanovce (a view from Červený breh)

- Flag Coat of arms

- Location within Košice

- Location of Sídlisko Ťahanovce in Slovakia
- Coordinates: 48°45′14″N 21°16′03″E
- Country: Slovakia
- Region: Košice
- District: Košice I
- Borough: 1984

Area
  - Total: 8.73 km^{2} (3.37 sq mi)
- Elevation: 259 m (850 ft)

Population (2025)
  - Total: 19,596

Population by ethnicity (2021)
  - Slovak: 87.72%
  - Hungarian: 1.95%
  - Roma: 0.43%
  - Rusyn: 0.63%
  - Ukrainian: 0.85%
  - Other: 7.69%

Population by religion (2021)
  - Roman Catholic: 45.32%
  - Greek Catholic: 6.96%
  - Lutheran: 3.31%
  - Calvinist: 1.97%
  - Orthodox: 2.0%
  - Other Christian: 1.87%
  - Non-religious: 29.9%
  - Other: 9.88%
- Time zone: UTC+1 (CET)
  - Summer (DST): UTC+2 (CEST)
- Postal code: 040 13
- Area code: +421-55
- Website: www.tahanovce.net

Sídlisko Ťahanovce ([pronunciation: 'seedlisko 'tyahano-utse], literally: "Ťahanovce Housing Estate", Hungarian: Tihany-lakótelep) is a borough (city ward) of Košice, Slovakia. Constructed in the late 1980s and consisting almost exclusively of prefabs, the estate offers little in terms of work opportunities or recreation, causing residents to spend most of their daytime elsewhere. The estate has long suffered from traffic jams and petty crime. The number of residents has slowly declined as more affluent inhabitants moved out but as of 2024 remains above 20,000, making the Ťahanovce Housing Estate one of the most densely populated parts of Košice.

== History ==
Construction of the housing estate started on 18 May 1984 nearby the village of Ťahanovce, which was an independent village until 1969 when it became incorporated in the city of Košice. Originally, the intention was to demolish the village and expand the housing estate over its location but the plan was later abandoned and the village was left standing. As a result, there are now two similarly named districts - Ťahanovce (the old village) and Sídlisko Ťahanovce (the housing estate) located next to each other. After initial landscaping works were done, the construction of prefabs started in May 1985. The first inhabitants moved in June 1988. The estate became an independent district within the city of Košice in 1990.

=== Renaissance tower ===
Almost all buildings in the estate are communist-era prefabs and so there are few architecturally notable construction. The only exception is a renaissance style tower from mid 17th century, originally constructed to mark an important trade route crossroad. The tower fell into disrepair in the 20th century but was renovated in 2002 to mark the occasion of visit of the president of Poland Aleksander Kwaśniewski to Košice. The tower is of historical importance to Poland as Polish volunteers who died in the area while covering retreat of Hungarian forces in the Hungarian Revolution of 1848 were buried there. The tower is prominently displayed on the coat of arms of the estate.

=== Demeter ===
An informal settlement, with a varying population of between 80 and 500 Romani people called Demeter grew around three small apartment buildings built in the late 1980s to house the Romani people. The informal housing was demolished in 2011 with the residents forcefully moved to other locations, while the original apartment buildings were retained to serve as social housing.

== Transportation ==
The estate is connected to the other parts of the city only by road. In mid 2010s, there was a plan to connect the estate with a tram line, which would also connect the estate to the train station located in the Ťahanovce village, but the project was indefinitely delayed.

== Geography ==
The municipality lies at an altitude of 259 metres (850 ft) and covers an area of 8.73 km^{2} (3.37 sq mi) (2025).

== Population ==
Population statistic (10 years)
Year	1995	2005	2015	2025
Count	0	23,524	22,735	19,596
Difference		–	−3.35%	−13.80%

Population statistic
Year	2024	2025
Count	19,826	19,596
Difference		−1.16%

It has a population of 19,596 people (31 December 2025).

=== Ethnicity ===
Census 2021 (1+ %)
Ethnicity	Number	Fraction
Slovak	18,495	88.64%
Not found out	1612	7.72%
Hungarian	558	2.67%
Rusyn	435	2.08%
Romani	230	1.1%
Czech	221	1.05%
Total	20,863	

In year 2021 was 20,863 people by ethnicity 18,495 as Slovak, 1612 as Not found out, 558 as Hungarian, 435 as Rusyn, 230 as Romani, 221 as Czech, 199 as Ukrainian, 59 as Other, 34 as Russian, 32 as German, 15 as Polish, 13 as Vietnamese, 11 as Italian, 8 as Albanian, 7 as English, 6 as Croatian, 6 as Bulgarian, 5 as Jewish, 4 as Chinese, 4 as Moravian, 3 as Irish, 3 as Serbian, 3 as Romanian, 3 as French, 2 as Turkish, 2 as Austrian, 1 as Silesian and 1 as Greek.

Note on population: The difference values of population numbers in the table "Population statistic" and in the sections "Ethnicity" & "Religion" is caused by the use of various statistical methods.

=== Religion ===
Census 2021 (1+ %)
Religion	Number	Fraction
Roman Catholic Church	9455	45.32%
None	6238	29.9%
Not found out	1745	8.36%
Greek Catholic Church	1453	6.96%
Evangelical Church	691	3.31%
Calvinist Church	412	1.97%
Eastern Orthodox Church	391	1.87%
Total	20,863	

In year 2021 was 20,863 people by religion 9455 from Roman Catholic Church, 6238 from None, 1745 from Not found out, 1453 from Greek Catholic Church, 691 from Evangelical Church, 412 from Calvinist Church, 391 from Eastern Orthodox Church, 93 from Ad hoc movements, 73 from Other, 63 from Jehovah's Witnesses, 48 from Apostolic Church, 44 from Christian Congregations in Slovakia, 34 from Other and not ascertained christian church, 32 from Buddhism, 19 from Seventh-day Adventist Church, 19 from Baptists Church, 18 from Paganism and natural spirituality, 12 from Islam, 7 from United Methodist Church, 5 from Bahá'i Community, 4 from Church of the Brethren, 3 from Jewish community, 3 from Hinduism and 1 from Old Catholic Church.

== Safety ==
Due to the youthful population, Sídlisko Ťahanovce and lack of public spaces, the estate struggled with the relatively high rate of petty crime and drug use in the 2000s. Nonetheless, according to an analysis of crime in Košice produced by the municipal police in 2014, the rate of crime in the estate was about equal to city average.

== Religion ==
A separate Latin rite Catholic parish for the housing estate was established in July 1995 by the decision of the Archbishop of Roman Catholic Archdiocese of Košice Alojz Tkáč. At the time, masses were held in a small chapel build from prefabs in February 1995. The construction of a church started in 2024. The newly constructed parish church dedicated to Saint Dominic Savio was consecrated in May 2022 by the Archbishop Bernard Bober. The old chapel was demolished in Fall 2022. The parish serves about 9,500 faithful living in the estate.

The Slovak Greek Catholic Church with about 1,500 faithful in the estate was originally served by the parish priest from the neighboring Furča housing estate. In 2001, a separate parish in Ťahanovce estate was created and a small chapel dedicated to Saints Pavel Peter Gojdič and Dominik Trčka was constructed.

== Notable people ==
- Richard Tury (born 1993) - professional skateboarder

== Gallery ==
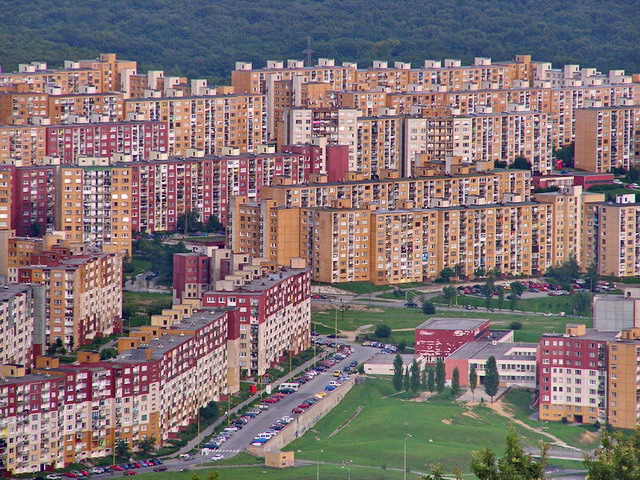
Apartment blocks from a distance

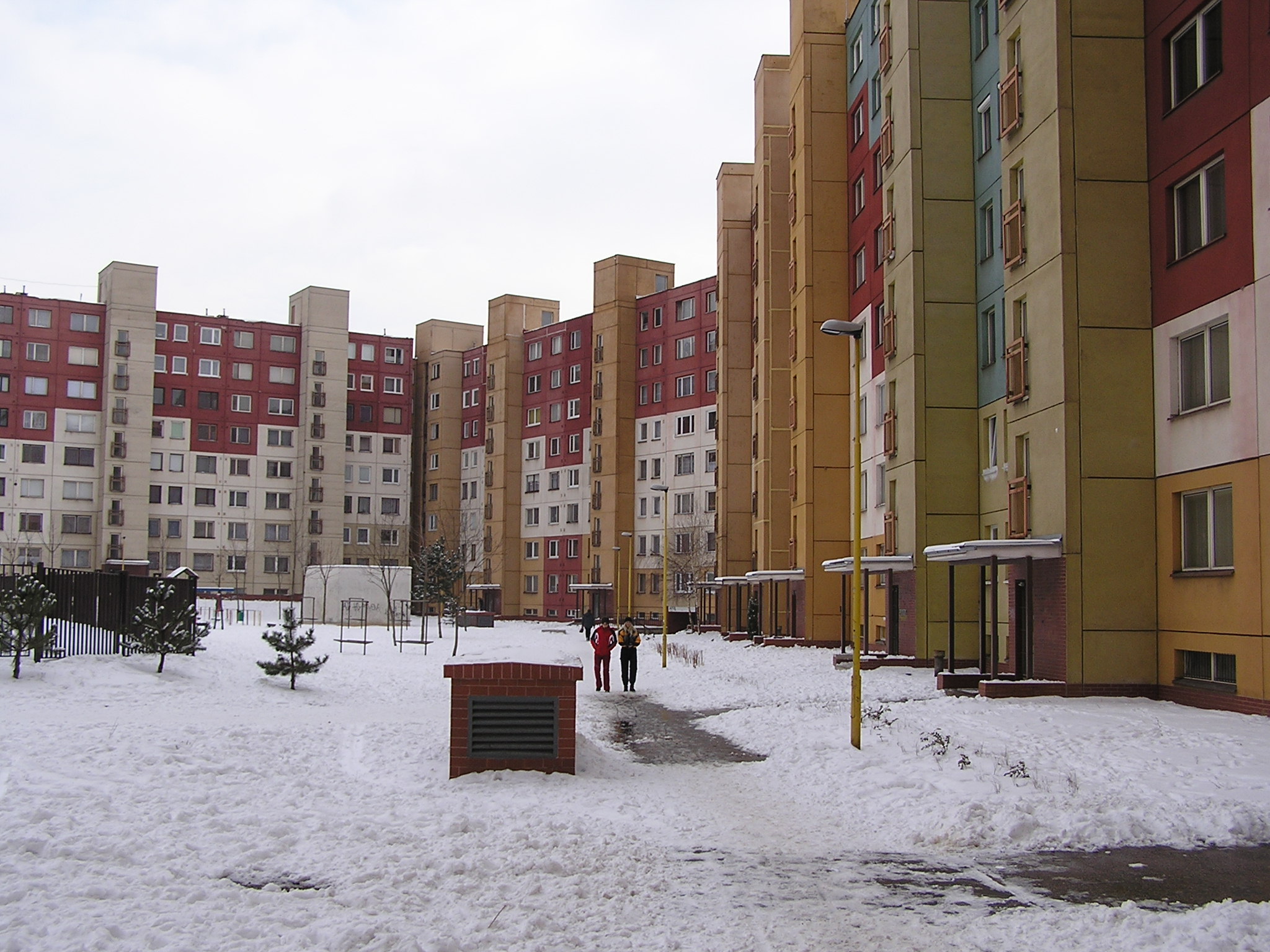
Apartment blocks at Sídlisko Ťahanovce

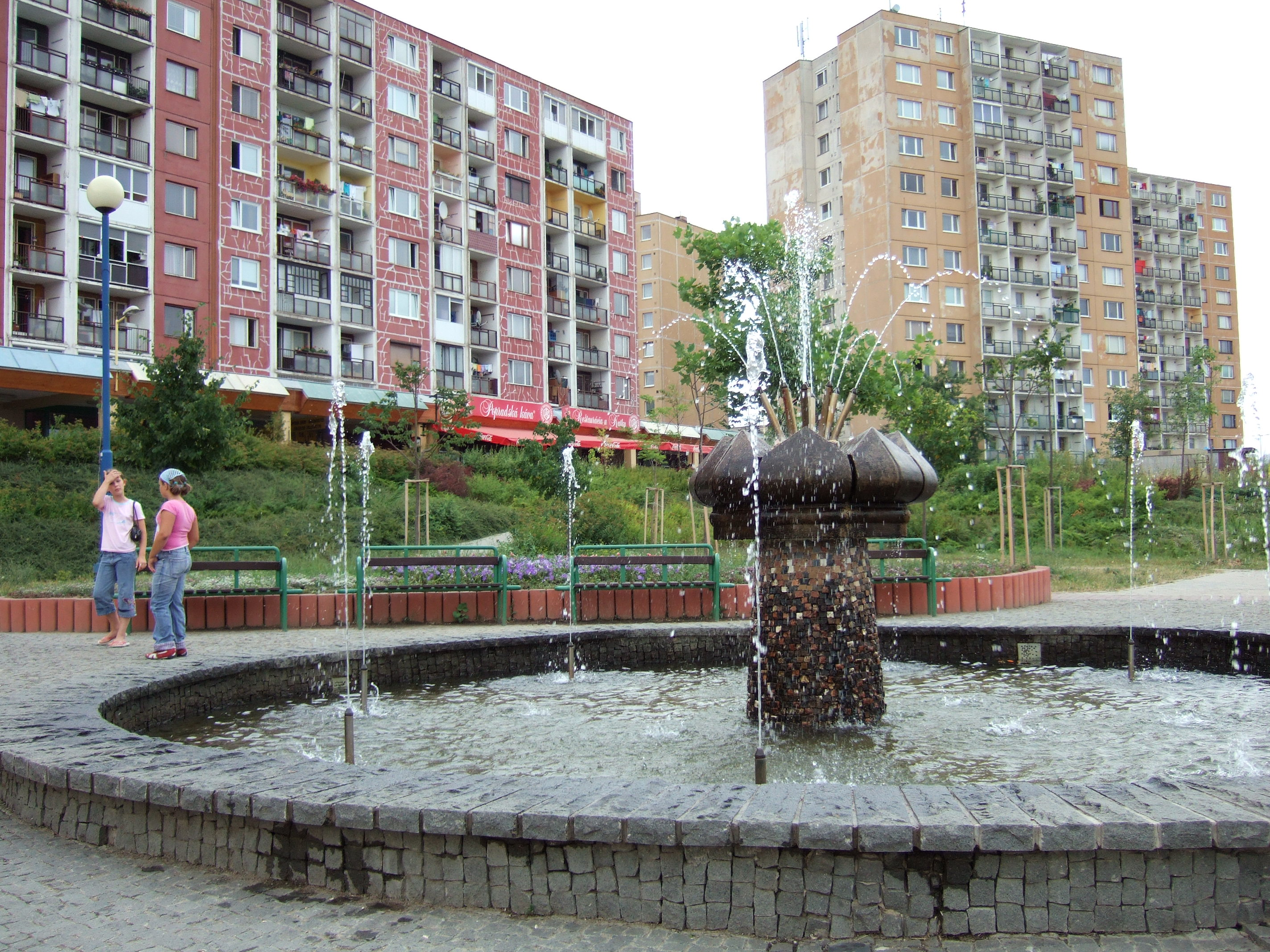
A fountain at Sídlisko Ťahanovce

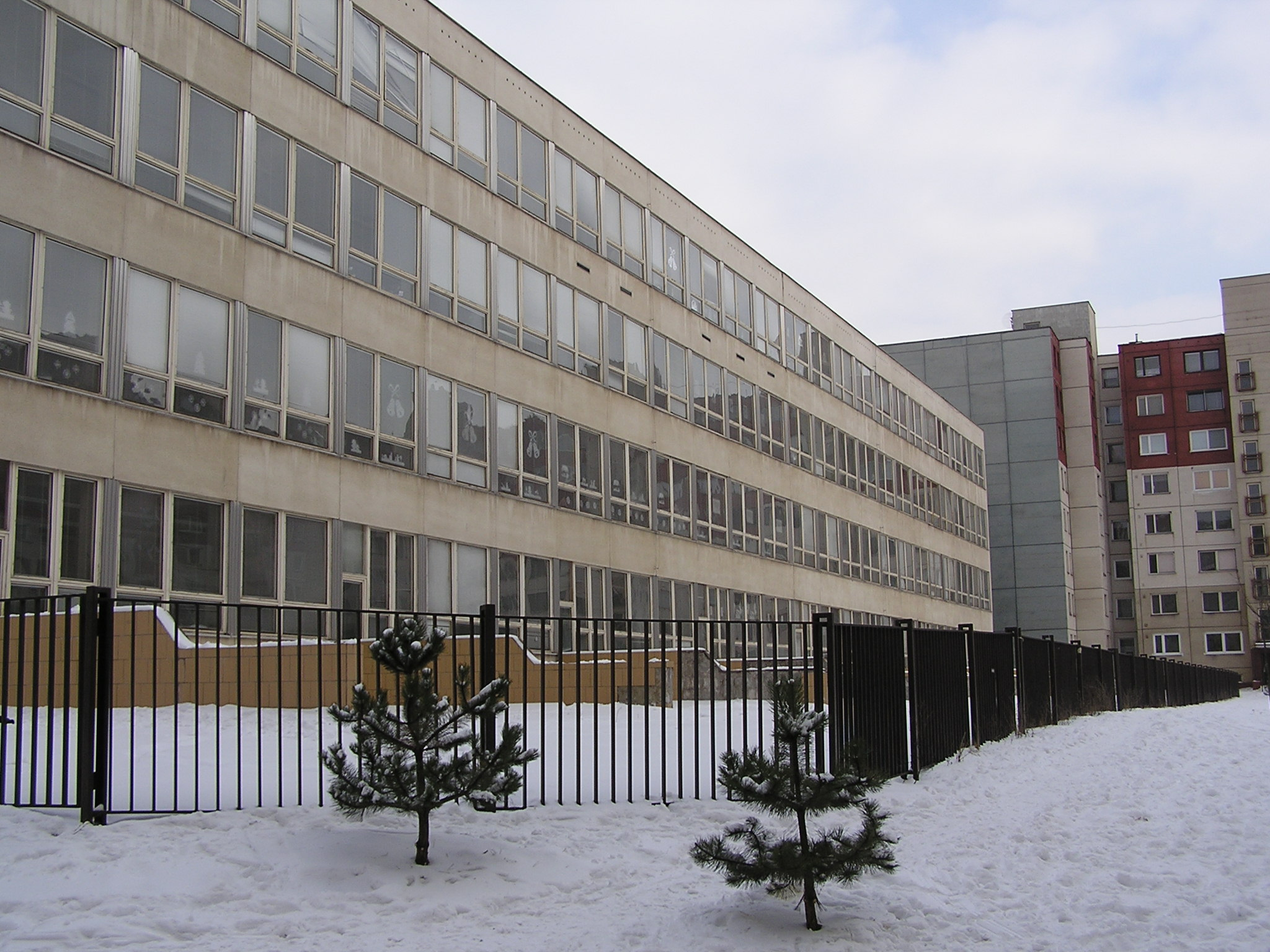
Elementary school at Bruselská Street is the biggest one in the whole Slovakia

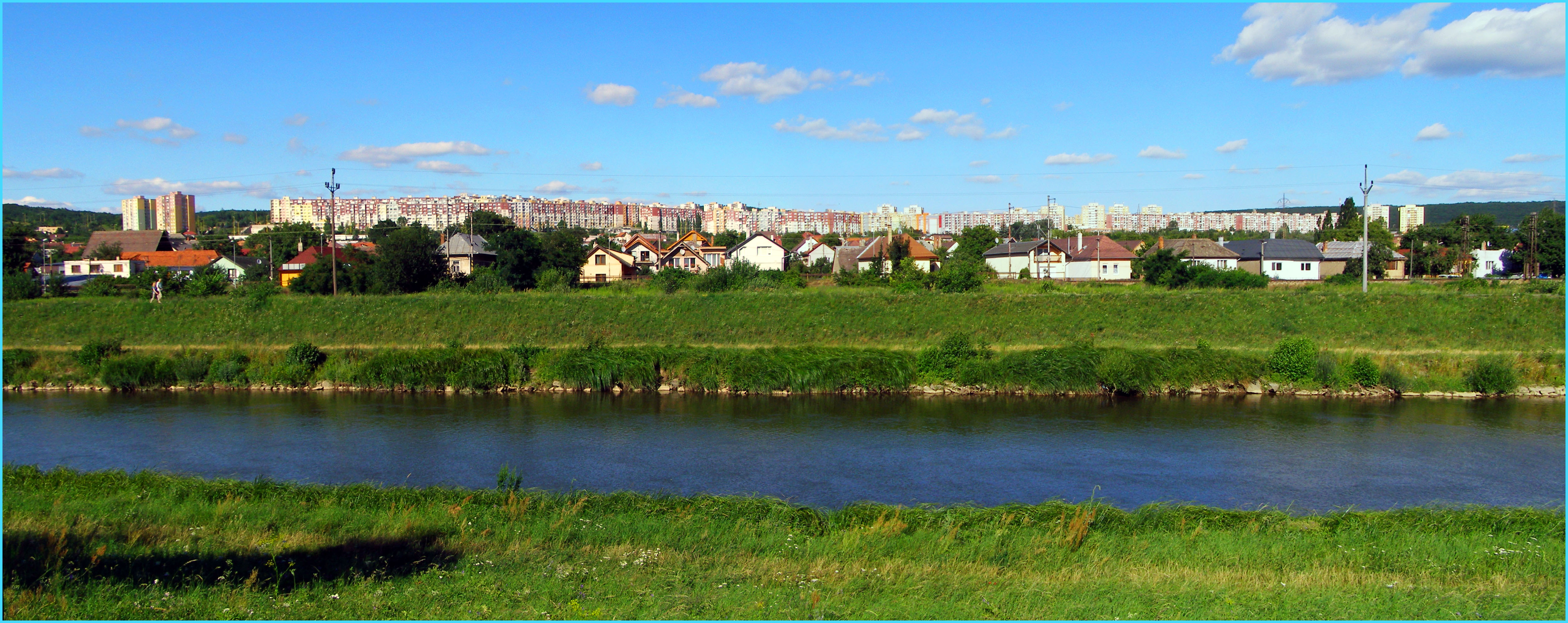
Overall panorama of Ťahanovce and Sídlisko Ťahanovce
