= Košice I =

Coordinates: 48°44′14″N 21°16′05″E

Košice I District
- District
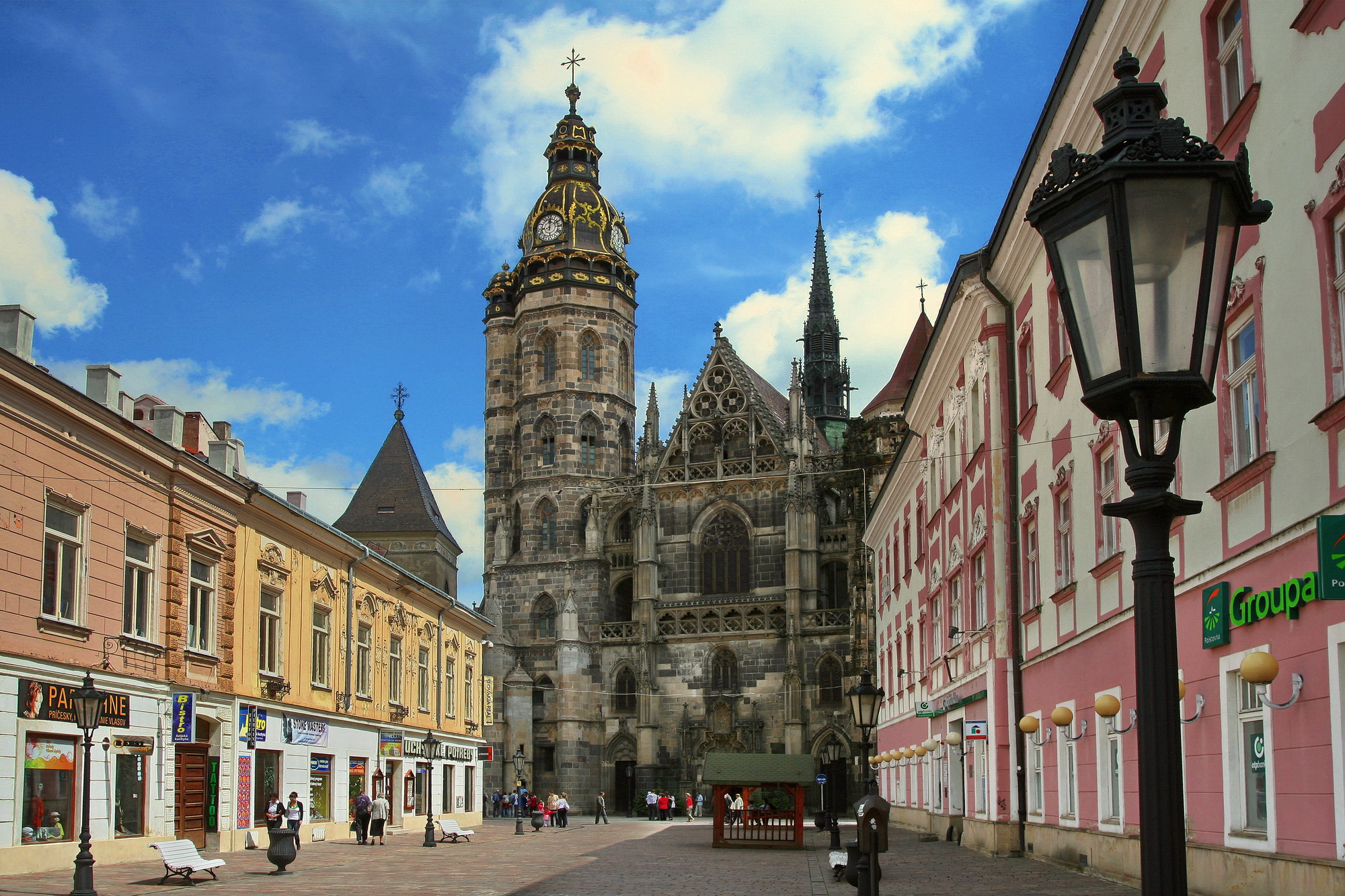
- Country: Slovakia
- Region (kraj): Košice Region
- Seat: Košice

Area
  - Total: 85.45 km^{2} (32.99 sq mi)

Population (2025)
  - Total: 62,243
- Time zone: UTC+1 (CET)
  - Summer (DST): UTC+2 (CEST)
- Telephone prefix: 055
- Vehicle registration plate (until 2022): KC
- Boroughs: 6

Košice I (Hungarian: Kassai I. járás) is a district in the Košice Region of eastern Slovakia, in the city of Košice. It is bordered by the Košice II, Košice III, Košice IV and Košice-okolie districts. Until 1918, the district was part of the Hungarian county of Abaúj-Torna.

== Population ==
Historical population
Year	Pop.	±%
1970	65,128	—
1980	60,643	−6.9%
1991	62,294	+2.7%
2001	68,262	+9.6%
2011	68,467	+0.3%
2021	64,453	−5.9%
Source: Censuses

Population statistic (10 years)
Year	1995	2005	2015	2025
Count	65,747	67,904	67,737	62,243
Difference		+3.28%	−0.24%	−8.11%

Population statistic
Year	2024	2025
Count	62,603	62,243
Difference		−0.57%

It has a population of 62,243 people (31 December 2025).

=== Ethnicity ===
Census 2021 (1+ %)
Ethnicity	Number	Fraction
Slovak	55,307	81.04%
Not found out	6167	9.03%
Hungarian	2557	3.74%
Rusyn	1137	1.66%
Czech	810	1.18%
Total	68,242	

In year 2021 was 68,242 people by ethnicity 55,307 as Slovak, 6167 as Not found out, 2557 as Hungarian, 1137 as Rusyn, 810 as Czech, 678 as Romani, 410 as Ukrainian, 406 as Other, 174 as German, 122 as Russian, 98 as Jewish, 60 as Polish, 44 as Italian, 32 as Moravian, 31 as Serbian, 28 as Vietnamese, 27 as Bulgarian, 21 as English, 20 as French, 20 as Albanian, 15 as Greek, 15 as Croatian, 14 as Romanian, 11 as Canadian, 10 as Irish, 7 as Chinese, 7 as Turkish, 7 as Austrian, 3 as Silesian, 3 as Korean and 1 as Iranian.

Note on population: The difference values of population numbers in the table "Population statistic" and in the sections "Ethnicity" & "Religion" is caused by the use of various statistical methods.

=== Religion ===
Census 2021 (1+ %)
Religion	Number	Fraction
Roman Catholic Church	27,507	42.68%
None	19,852	30.8%
Not found out	6740	10.46%
Greek Catholic Church	4034	6.26%
Evangelical Church	2395	3.72%
Calvinist Church	1259	1.95%
Eastern Orthodox Church	971	1.51%
Total	64,453	

In year 2021 was 64,453 people by religion 27,507 from Roman Catholic Church, 19,852 from None, 6740 from Not found out, 4034 from Greek Catholic Church, 2395 from Evangelical Church, 1259 from Calvinist Church, 971 from Eastern Orthodox Church, 259 from Other, 245 from Ad hoc movements, 185 from Jehovah's Witnesses, 174 from Apostolic Church, 143 from Other and not ascertained christian church, 124 from Buddhism, 111 from Christian Congregations in Slovakia, 109 from Jewish community, 75 from Baptists Church, 71 from Islam, 47 from Paganism and natural spirituality, 46 from Seventh-day Adventist Church, 30 from Church of the Brethren, 23 from United Methodist Church, 16 from Old Catholic Church, 12 from Hinduism, 12 from Bahá'i Community, 9 from Czechoslovak Hussite Church, 3 from Church of Jesus Christ of Latter-day Saints and 1 from New Apostolic Church.

== Boroughs ==
Municipality	Area [km^{2}]	Population
Džungľa	0.46	797
Kavečany	10.50	1,388
Old Town	4.35	20,200
Sever	54.79	18,073
Sídlisko Ťahanovce	8.73	19,596
Ťahanovce	7.42	2,189

Population and area values are current for year 2025.
