= Kavečany =

Coordinates: 48°47′N 21°13′E

- Borough
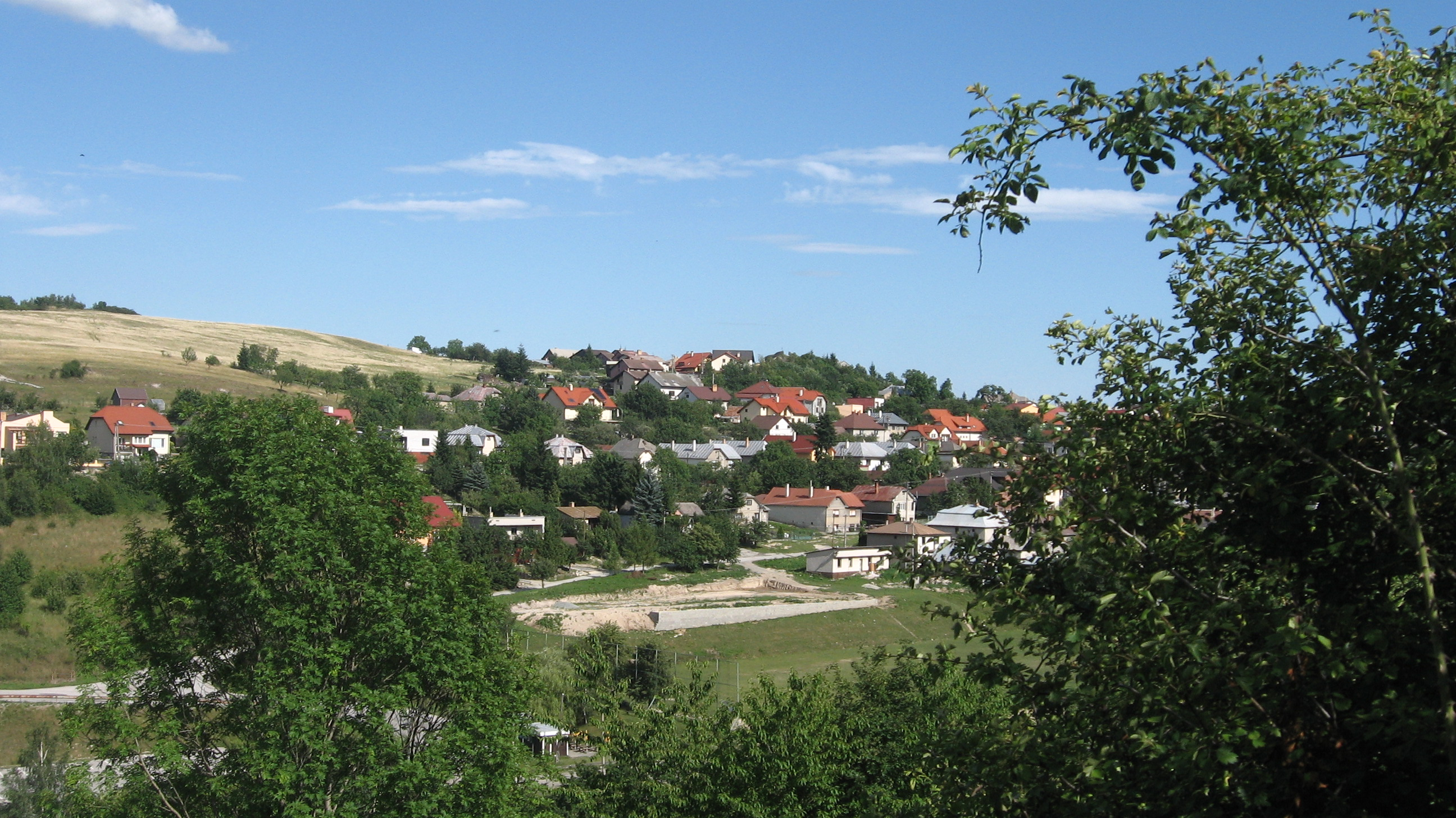
- General view of houses in Kavečany (July 2007)

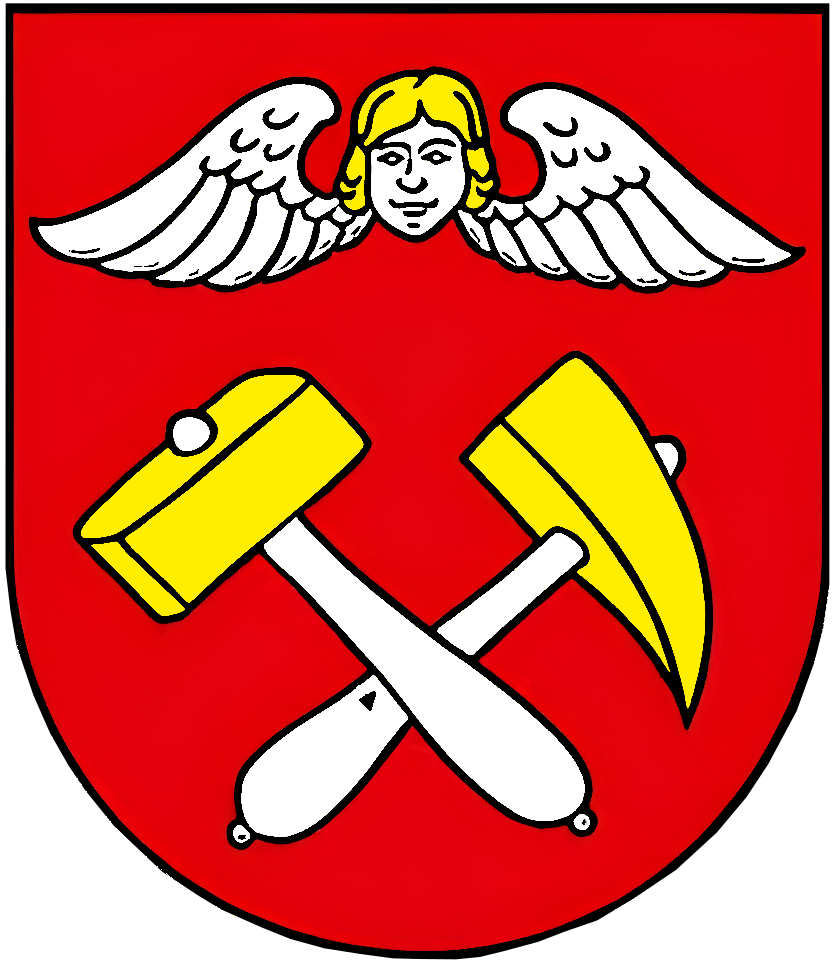
- Flag Coat of arms

- Location within Košice

- Location of Kavečany in Slovakia
- Country: Slovakia
- Region: Košice
- District: Košice I
- Village: 1347 (first known record)
- Borough: 1976

Government
  - Mayor: Martin Balčík (Independent)

Area
  - Total: 10.50 km^{2} (4.05 sq mi)
- Elevation: 458 m (1,503 ft)

Population (2025)
  - Total: 1,388

Population by ethnicity (2011)
  - Slovak: 95.2%
  - Hungarian: 0.2%
  - Rusyn: 0.2%
  - Other: 0.5%
  - Unreported: 3.9%

Population by religion (2011)
  - Roman Catholic: 82.5%
  - Calvinist: 1.3%
  - Greek Catholic: 0.9%
  - Lutheran: 0.8%
  - Other: 1.8%
  - Non-religious: 7.3%
  - Unreported: 5.4%
- Time zone: UTC+1 (CET)
  - Summer (DST): UTC+2 (CEST)
- Postal code: 040 01
- Area code: +421-55
- Vehicle registration plate (until 2022): KE
- Website: www.kosicekavecany.sk

Kavečany (Hungarian: Kavocsán) is a borough (city ward) of Košice, Slovakia. The borough is situated 6 km northwest of Košice, at an altitude of roughly 453 metres (1,486 ft) above sea level, in the Košice I district. Kavečany retains a rural character, with a population of more than 1150 inhabitants. It's known mostly as a place for recreation and relaxation. Kavečany is famous for its ski center, summer toboggan track, and the Košice Zoo.

== History ==
Until 1976, Kavečany was a separate municipality, classified as a village. In 1976, it was merged with the city of Košice and became one of its outer boroughs, as part of the urban Košice I district.

The village of Kavečany first appeared in written records in 1347.

== Geography ==
The municipality lies at an altitude of 458 metres (1,503 ft) and covers an area of 10.50 km^{2} (4.05 sq mi) (2025).

== Population ==
Population statistic (10 years)
Year	1995	2005	2015	2025
Count	0	1101	1289	1388
Difference		–	+17.07%	+7.68%

Population statistic
Year	2024	2025
Count	1355	1388
Difference		+2.43%

It has a population of 1388 people (31 December 2025).

=== Ethnicity ===
Census 2021 (1+ %)
Ethnicity	Number	Fraction
Slovak	1323	98.29%
Rusyn	15	1.11%
Total	1346	

In year 2021 was 1346 people by ethnicity 1323 as Slovak, 15 as Rusyn, 13 as Not found out, 11 as Romani, 9 as Hungarian, 9 as Other, 5 as Moravian, 4 as Ukrainian, 3 as Jewish, 3 as Czech, 1 as Russian and 1 as Croatian.

Note on population: The difference values of population numbers in the table "Population statistic" and in the sections "Ethnicity" & "Religion" is caused by the use of various statistical methods.

=== Religion ===
Census 2021 (1+ %)
Religion	Number	Fraction
Roman Catholic Church	1003	74.52%
None	233	17.31%
Greek Catholic Church	34	2.53%
Evangelical Church	23	1.71%
Total	1346	

In year 2021 was 1346 people by religion 1003 from Roman Catholic Church, 233 from None, 34 from Greek Catholic Church, 23 from Evangelical Church, 13 from Calvinist Church, 11 from Not found out, 7 from Eastern Orthodox Church, 4 from Other, 4 from Buddhism, 3 from Jehovah's Witnesses, 3 from Islam, 2 from Apostolic Church, 2 from Ad hoc movements, 1 from Jewish community, 1 from Other and not ascertained christian church, 1 from Christian Congregations in Slovakia and 1 from United Methodist Church.

== Tourism ==
Kavečany is a place for recreational activities. The ski resort offers a variety of services including snowmaking. There are conditions for both cross-country and downhill skiing here. Other local attractions include the summer toboggan track and the third-largest zoological garden in Europe. The surrounding countryside offers many hiking and biking trails which extend to the area of Čierna Hora.

== Cultural festivals ==
The most interesting cultural and social events during the year are associated with the local folklore ensemble "Kavečianka", who preserves the traditions of their ancestors through songs and dance routines.

== Sports events ==
The annual half marathon run and the new motocross race are the most significant sports events in the village.

== Basic data ==
- Latitude: 48.7833, Longitude: 21.2167
- Latitude (DMS): 48° 46' 60N, Longitude (DMS): 21° 13' 0E
- Altitude: 1,217 feet (350 m)

== Gallery ==
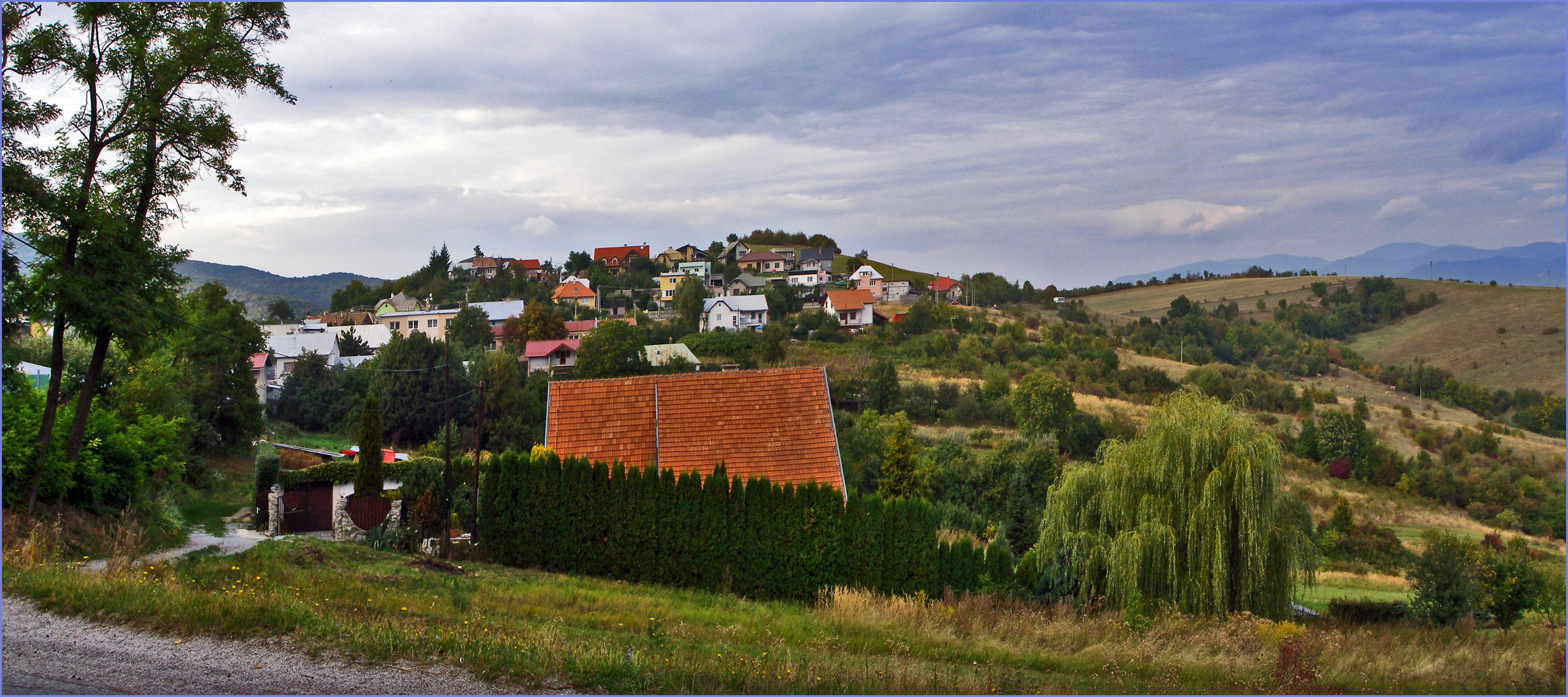
Panorama of Kavečany among Košice's northern hills

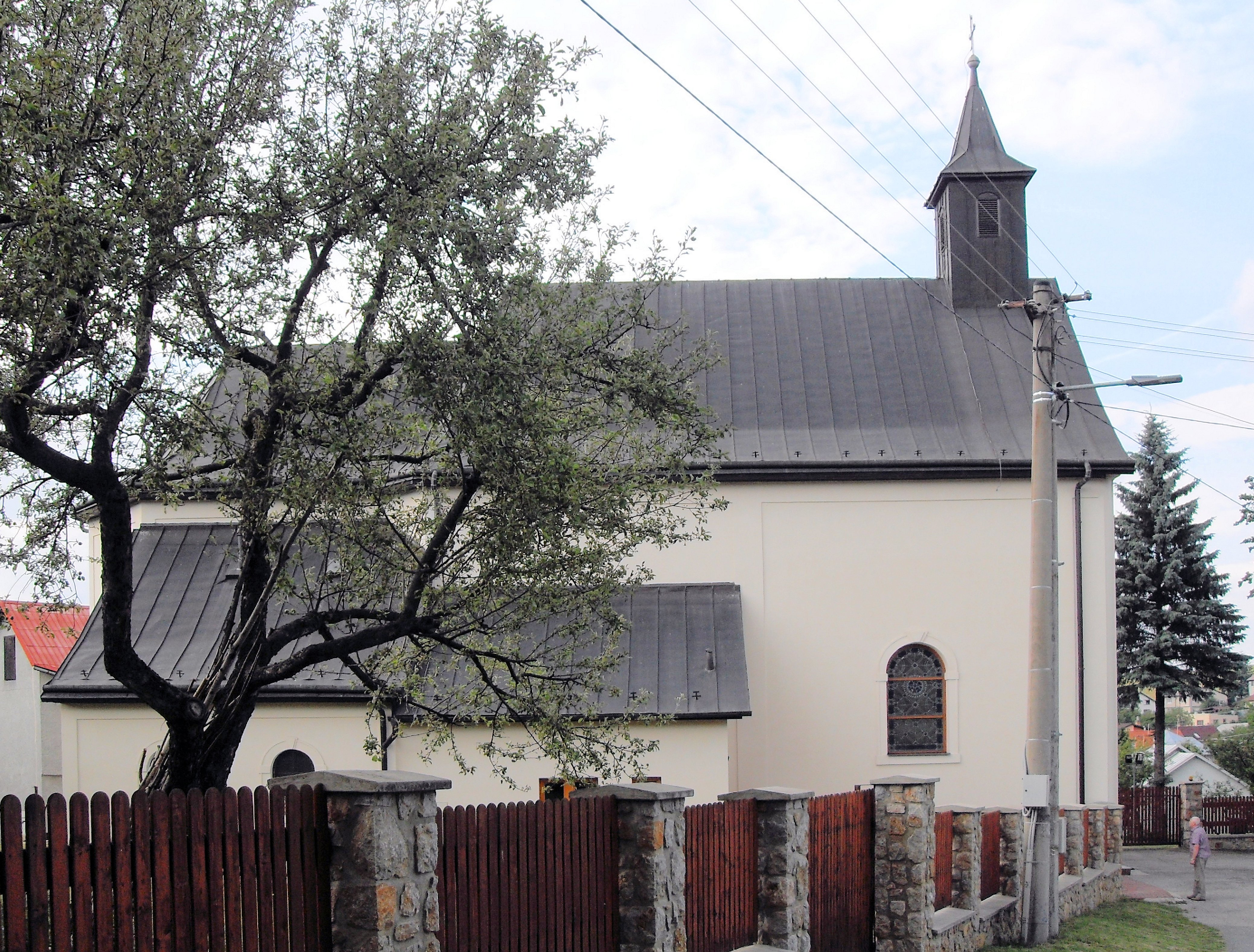
Church of St Peter and St Paul

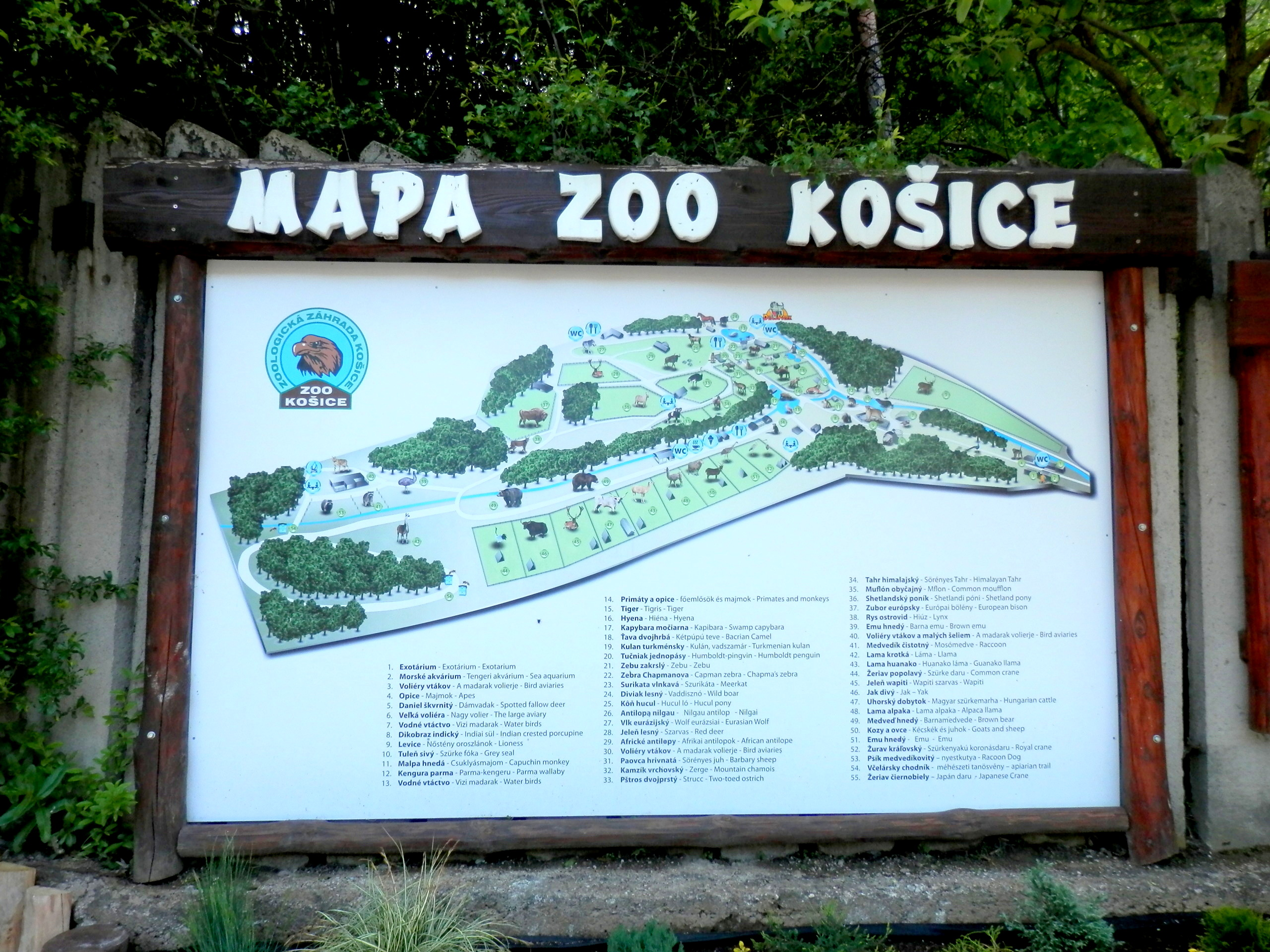
Map of Košice zoo in Kavečany

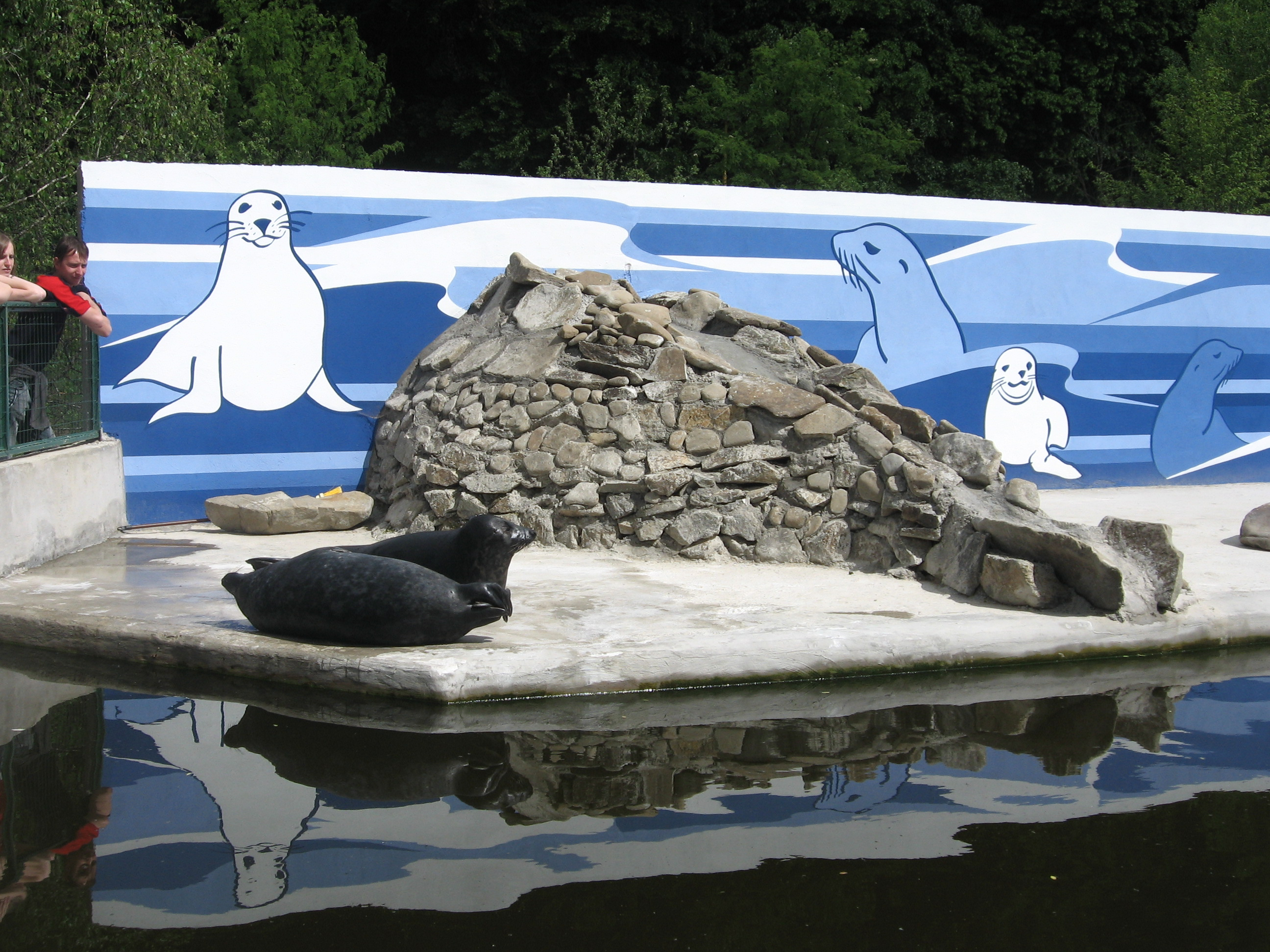
Seals at the Košice zoo in Kavečany

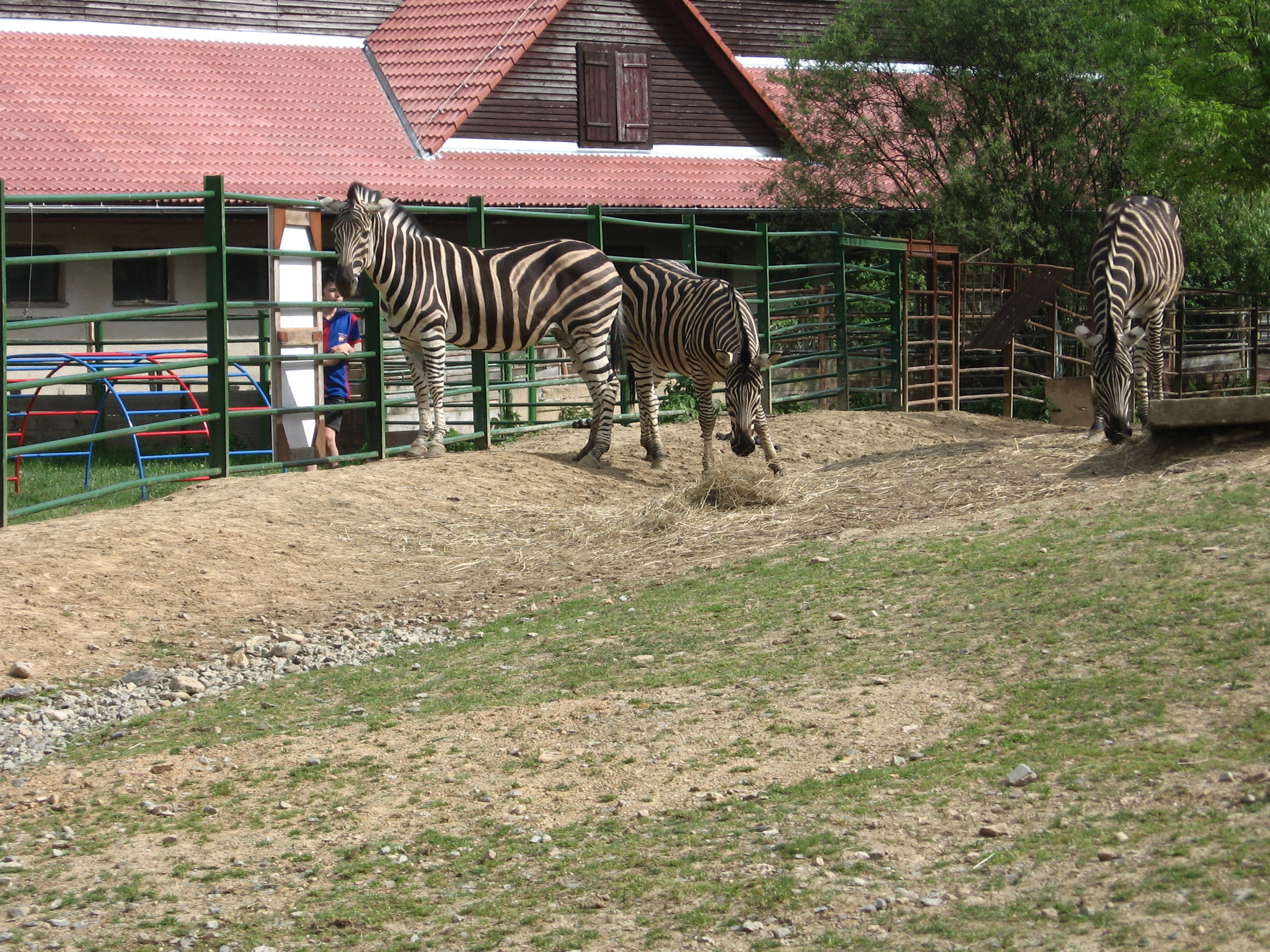
Zebras at the Košice zoo in Kavečany

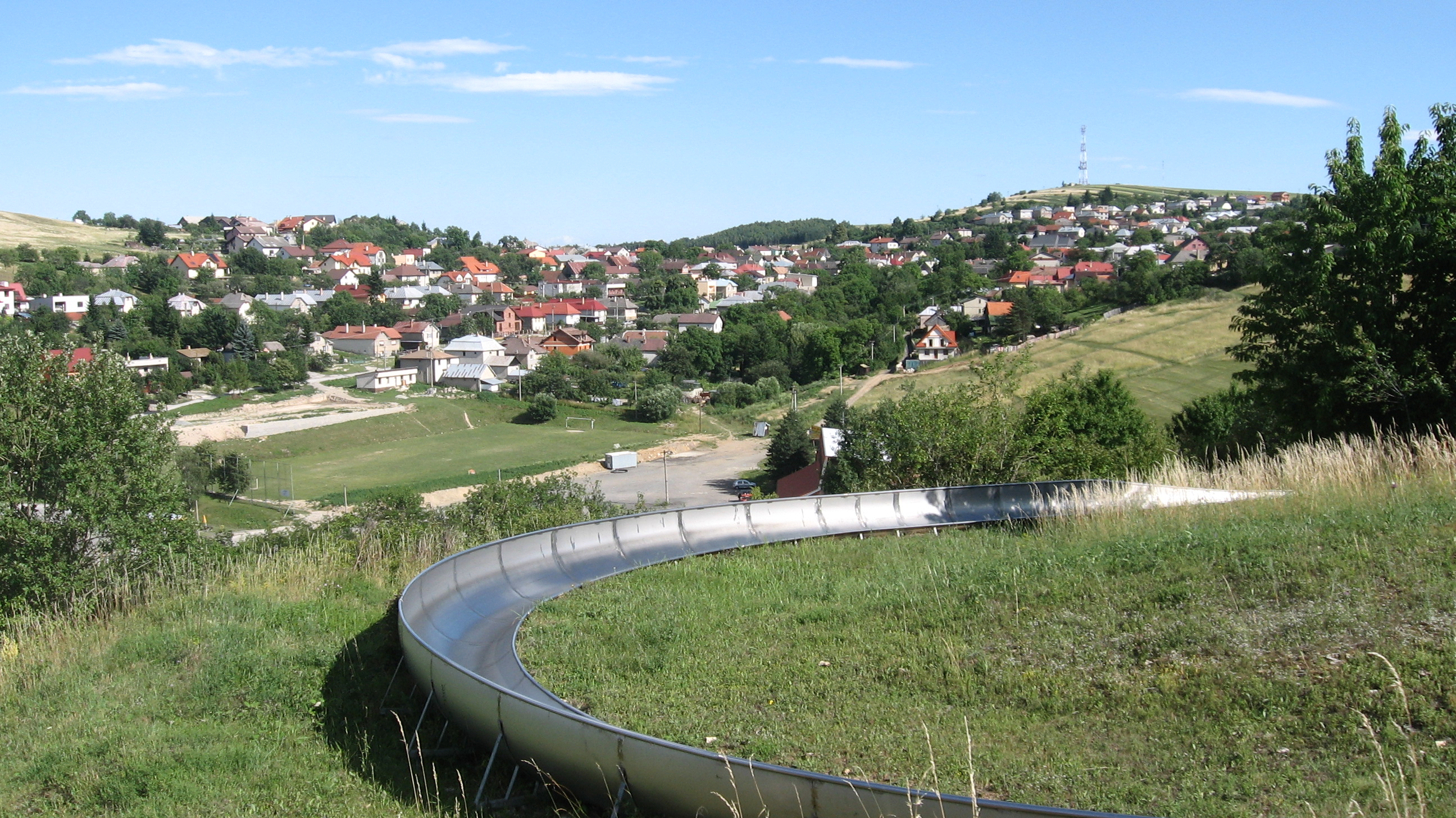
Summer toboggan track near Kavečany

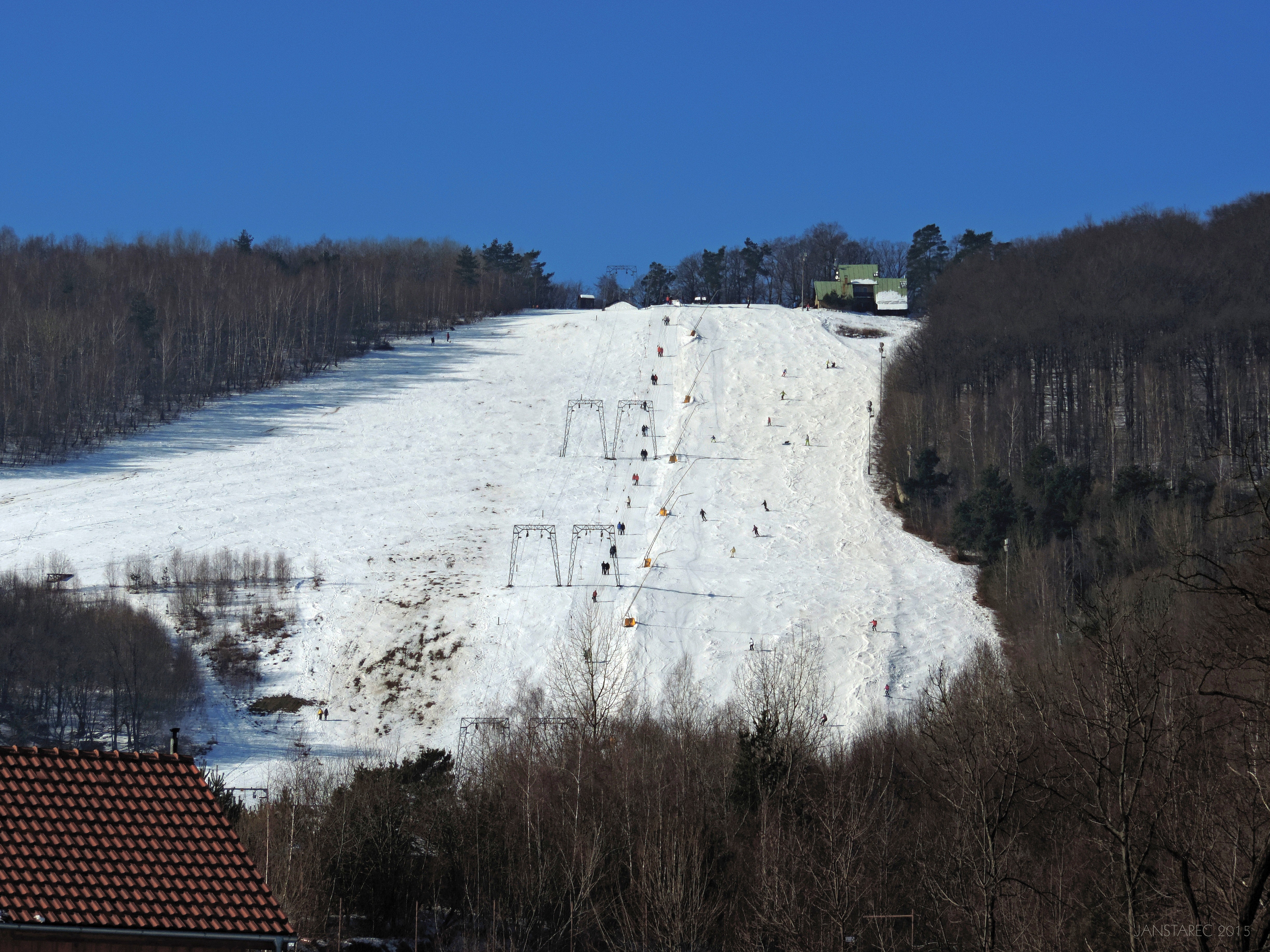
Hrešná skiing slope, local ski centre

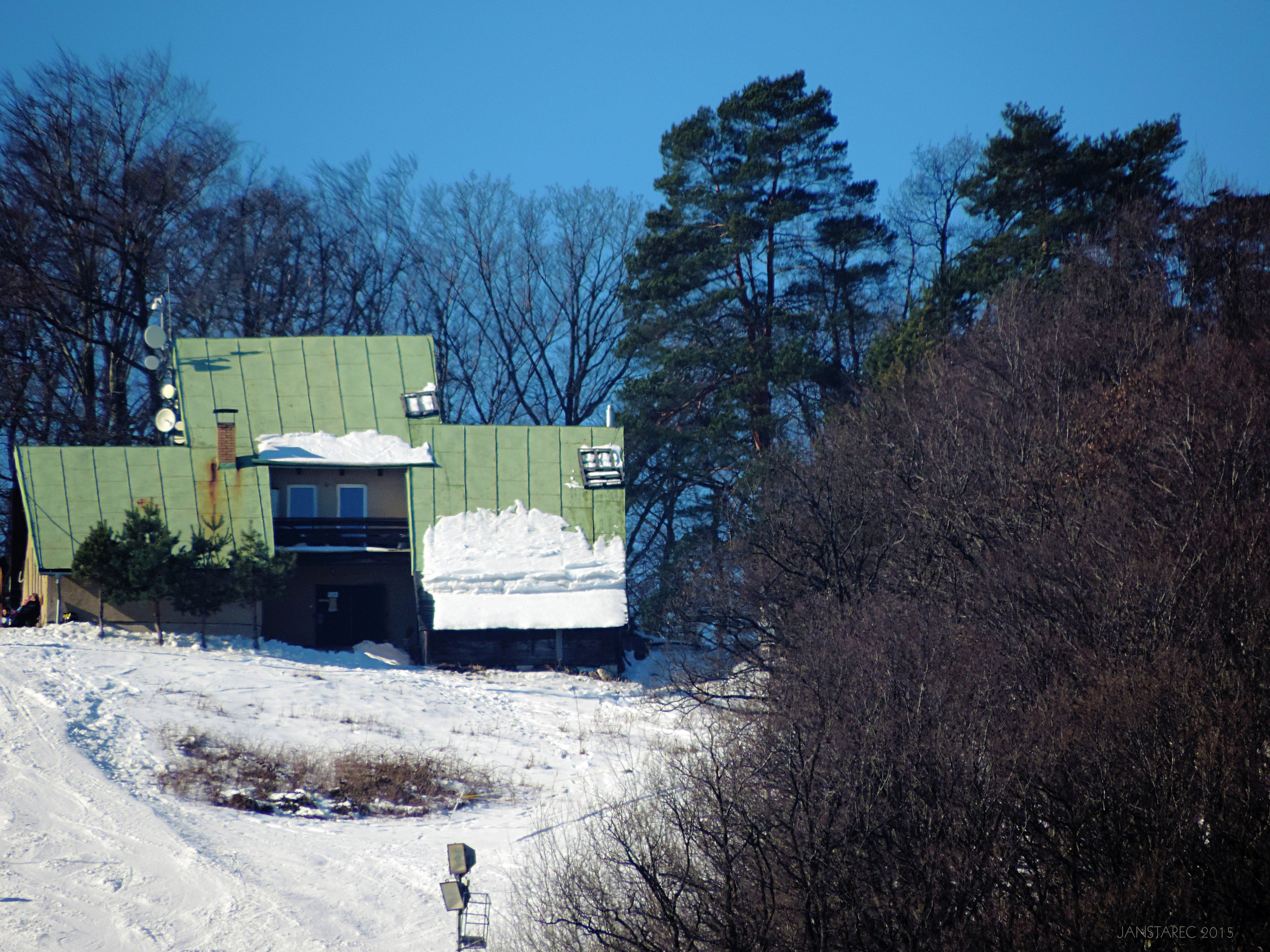
Chalet at Hrešná

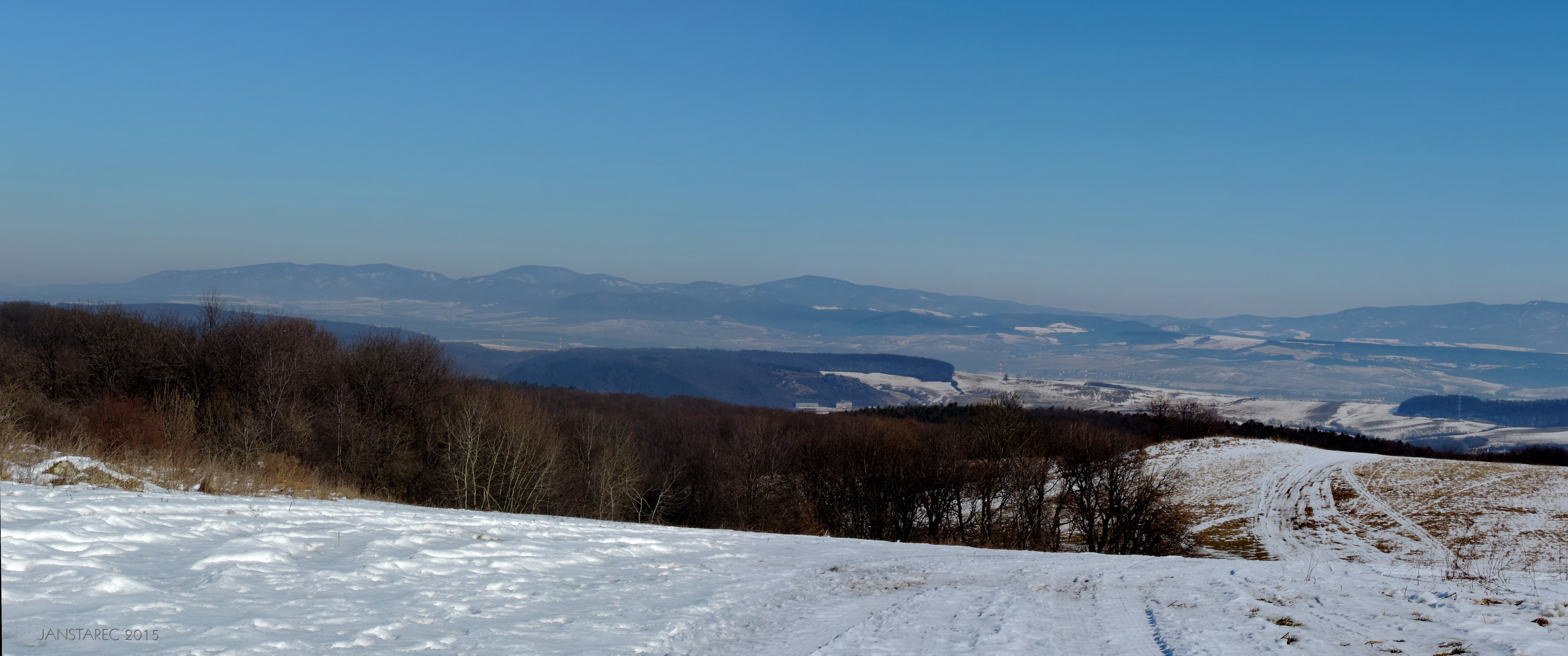
A view of the Slanské Hills range from Kavečany

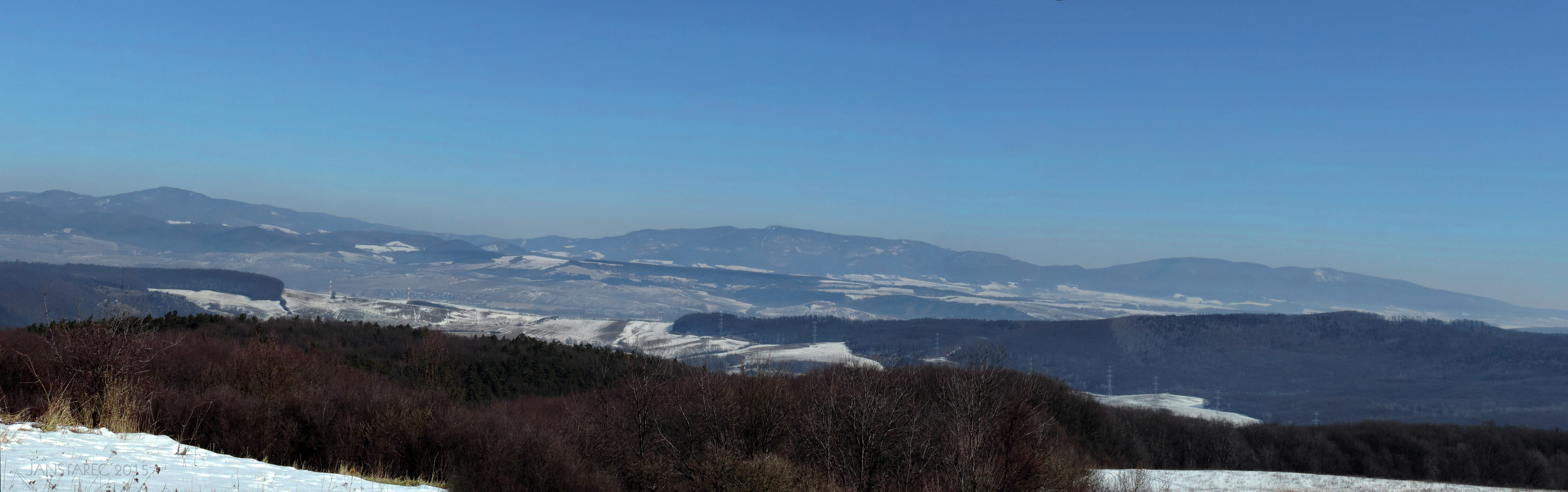
A view of the Slanské Hills range from Kavečany
