= Old Town, Košice =

Košice Old Town Košice Staré Mesto
- Borough
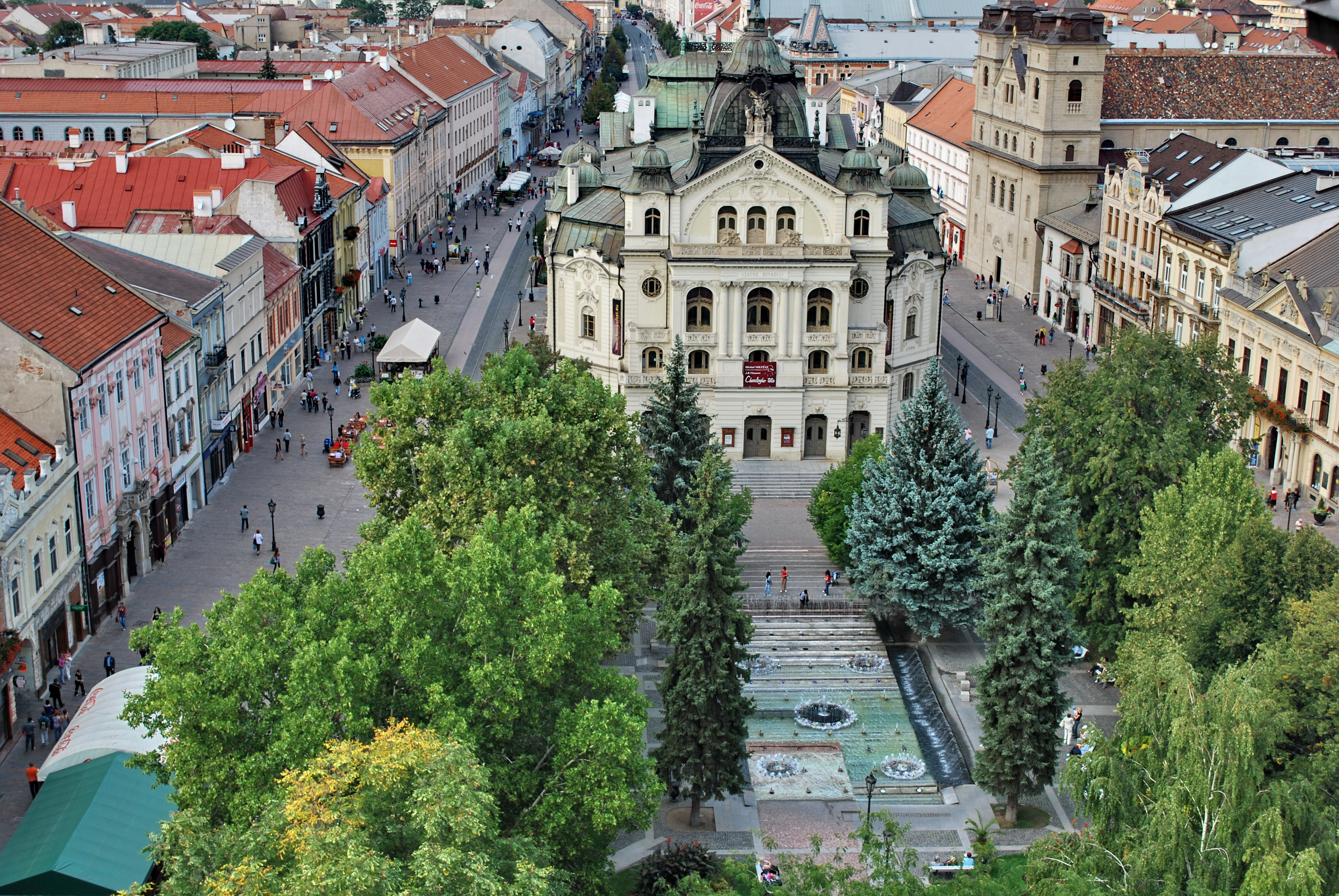
- Central area of Košice Old Town (Staré Mesto)

- Flag Coat of arms

- Location within Košice

- Location of Košice Staré Mesto in Slovakia
- Coordinates: 48.723°N 21.257°E
- Country: Slovakia
- Region: Košice
- District: Košice I
- Town: 13th century
- Borough: Oldest borough (13th/14th century)

Area
  - Total: 4.35 km^{2} (1.68 sq mi)
- Elevation: 208 m (682 ft)

Population (2025)
  - Total: 20,200

Population by ethnicity (2011)
  - Slovak: 65.2%
  - Hungarian: 4.3%
  - Czech: 1.0%
  - Rusyn: 0.7%
  - Roma: 0.6%
  - Other: 1.2%
  - Unreported: 27%

Population by religion (2011)
  - Roman Catholic: 37.4%
  - Greek Catholic: 5.4%
  - Lutheran: 4%
  - Calvinist: 2.3%
  - Orthodox: 1.1%
  - Jewish: 0.5%
  - Other: 1.9%
  - Non-religious: 17.5%
  - Unreported: 29.9%
- Time zone: UTC+1 (CET)
  - Summer (DST): UTC+2 (CEST)
- Postal code: 04001
- Area code: +421-55
- Vehicle registration plate (until 2022): KE
- Website: www.kosice-city.sk

Košice Staré Mesto (literally: "Košice Old Town", Hungarian: Kassa-Óváros) is a borough (city ward) of Košice, Slovakia. It encompasses the historical centre of the city, consisting of the medieval and early modern core of Košice, with many preserved historical buildings of several architectural styles, and a small number of more modern architecture. The borough also includes the immediate environs of the historical centre (e.g. Mestský park ("City Park"), Staničné námestie ("Station Square") with the main train station, etc.).

== Statistics ==
- Area: 4.34 square kilometres (1.68 sq mi)
- Population: 20,751 (31 December 2017)
- Population density: 4,800/km^{2} (31 December 2017)
- District: Košice I
- Mayor: Ing. Igor Petrovčik (as of 2018 elections)

== Geography ==
The municipality lies at an altitude of 208 metres (682 ft) and covers an area of 4.35 km^{2} (1.68 sq mi) (2025).

== Population ==
Population statistic (10 years)
Year	1995	2005	2015	2025
Count	0	21,234	20,379	20,200
Difference		–	−4.02%	−0.87%

Population statistic
Year	2024	2025
Count	20,236	20,200
Difference		−0.17%

It has a population of 20,200 people (31 December 2025).

=== Ethnicity ===
Census 2021 (1+%)
Ethnicity	Number	Fraction
Slovak	16,271	80.81%
Not found out	2586	12.84%
Hungarian	1132	5.62%
Rusyn	387	1.92%
Czech	302	1.5%
Total	20,133	

In year 2021 was 20,133 people by ethnicity 16,271 as Slovak, 2586 as Not found out, 1132 as Hungarian, 387 as Rusyn, 302 as Czech, 167 as Other, 137 as Romani, 120 as Ukrainian, 65 as German, 64 as Jewish, 49 as Russian, 24 as Polish, 23 as Italian, 18 as Serbian, 14 as Vietnamese, 11 as Bulgarian, 10 as Moravian, 10 as Albanian, 9 as French, 9 as English, 8 as Romanian, 6 as Greek, 5 as Croatian, 3 as Irish, 3 as Turkish, 3 as Austrian, 2 as Silesian, 2 as Korean, 2 as Canadian and 1 as Iranian.

Note on population: The difference values of population numbers in the table "Population statistic" and in the sections "Ethnicity" & "Religion" is caused by the use of various statistical methods.

=== Religion ===
Census 2021 (1+%)
Religion	Number	Fraction
Roman Catholic Church	7587	37.68%
None	6478	32.18%
Not found out	2598	12.9%
Greek Catholic Church	1236	6.14%
Evangelical Church	874	4.34%
Calvinist Church	422	2.1%
Eastern Orthodox Church	312	1.55%
Total	20,133	

In year 2021 was 20,133 people by religion 7587 from Roman Catholic Church, 6478 from None, 2598 from Not found out, 1236 from Greek Catholic Church, 874 from Evangelical Church, 422 from Calvinist Church, 312 from Eastern Orthodox Church, 83 from Ad hoc movements, 80 from Other, 78 from Jewish community, 66 from Jehovah's Witnesses, 57 from Apostolic Church, 49 from Other and not ascertained christian church, 42 from Buddhism, 37 from Baptists Church, 35 from Christian Congregations in Slovakia, 26 from Islam, 17 from Seventh-day Adventist Church, 14 from Church of the Brethren, 11 from Paganism and natural spirituality, 7 from Czechoslovak Hussite Church, 6 from Old Catholic Church, 6 from Bahá'i Community, 5 from Hinduism, 4 from United Methodist Church and 3 from Church of Jesus Christ of Latter-day Saints.

== Historical landmarks ==
Churches and synagogues

- St Elisabeth Cathedral (Main Street)
- St Michael Chapel (Main Street)
- Church of the Assumption of the Virgin Mary (Dominican Church)
- St Anthony of Padua Church (Main Street)
- Evangelical Church (Mlynská Street)
- Calvinist Church (Hrnčiarska Street)
- Cathedral of the Nativity of the Mother of God (Moyzesova Street)
- Orthodox Synagogue (Zvonárska Street)
- New Orthodox Synagogue (Puškinova Street)

Old housing and public buildings

- Levoča House (15th century townhouse and inn, Main Street)
- Mikluš Prison (late-medieval city houses converted into the old city prison)
- St. Urban Tower (medieval bell tower, Main Street)
- State Theatre Košice (Main Street)
- Captain Palace, headquarters of the Slovak Technical Museum (Main Street)
- Jakab Palace (Mlynská Street)
- St Charles Borromeo Seminary (Main Street)
- Craftsman's Lane historical housing and workshops (Hrnčiarska Street)

Memorials and monuments

- Plague Column, Košice (Main Street)

Fortifications

- Lower Gate (Dolná brána) fortification complex (Main Street, exhibition)
- Executioner's Bastion (Stará baštová Street, exhibition)
- Ruins of city walls (Hrnčiarska Street, Mlynská Street, Hradbová Street, Čajkovskéko Street, et al.)
- Ruins of the Košice citadel fortress (Liberators' Square, publicly displayed)
- Ruins of the stone bridge on Elisabeth Street (publicly displayed)

Industrial heritage

- Late-medieval horse mill and early modern gunpowder storeroom (Zbrojničná Street)
- Stará sladovňa, 19th century Old Town brewery (Štúr Street)
- Old tobacco factory Tabačka (Gorkého Street, converted into Tabačka Kulturfabrik art centre)

== Museums and art galleries ==
- East Slovak Museum (Marathon Runners' Square)
  - Medieval Fortifications of the City of Košice (branch exhibition, Executioner's Bastion, Stará Baštová Street)
  - City history exhibition (branch exhibition, Mikluš Prison, Pri Miklušovej väznici Street)
  - The House of Crafts (branch exhibition, Hrnčiarska Street)
  - Historical art exhibition (branch exhibition, Hviezdoslavova Street)
  - Natural history exhibition (branch exhibition, Hviezdoslavova Street)
- Slovak Technical Museum (Main Street)
- East Slovak Gallery (Main Street)
- Lower Gate (Dolná brána) Archaeological Exhibition (Main Street)
- Museum of the Victims of Communism (Moyzesova Street)
- Kunsthalle Košice - Art and exhibition centre.

== Infrastructure ==
- Košice railway station - Main railway station of the city, at Staničné námestie ("Station Square").

== Gallery ==
Main Street (Hlavná ulica)

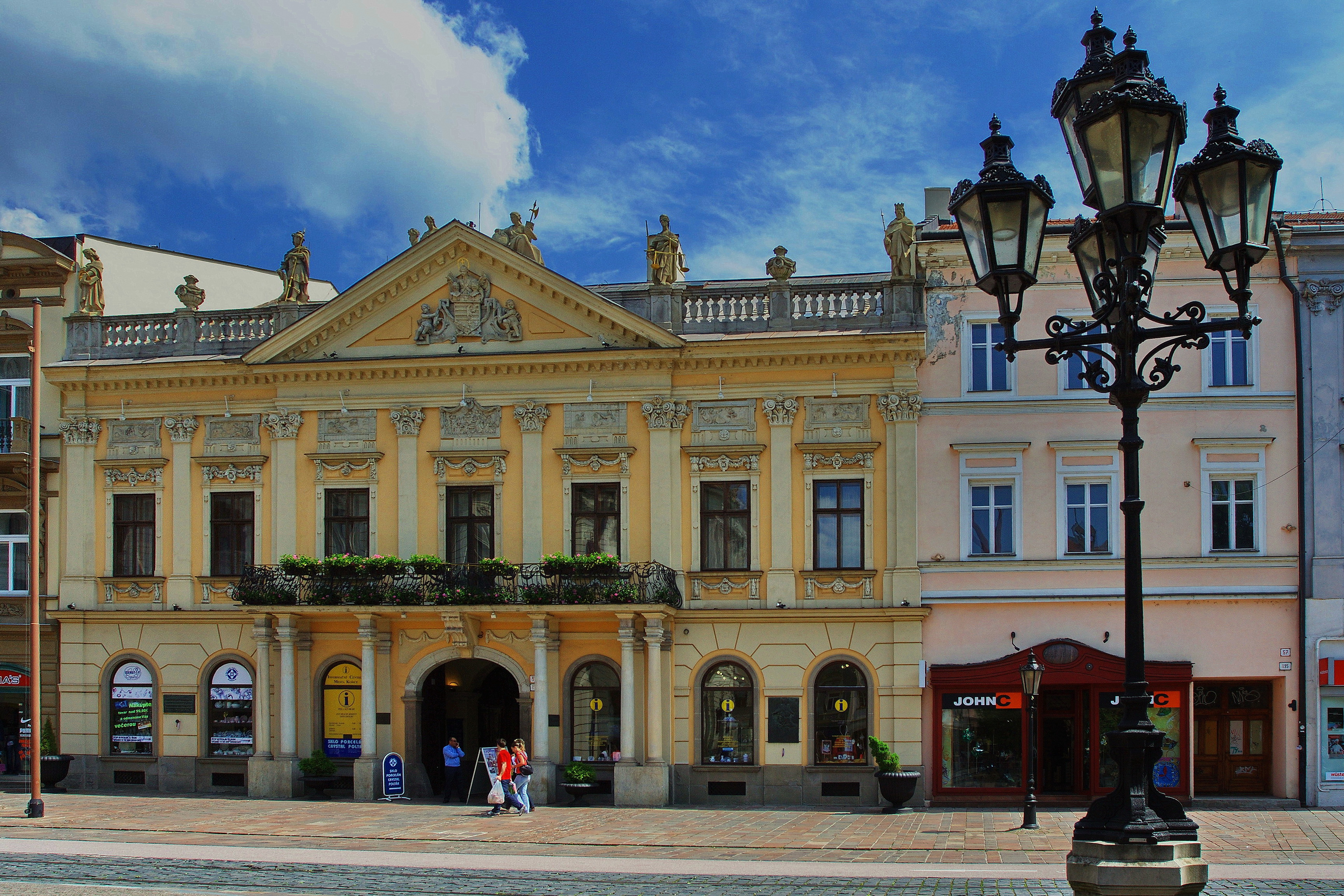
Košice Old Town Hall

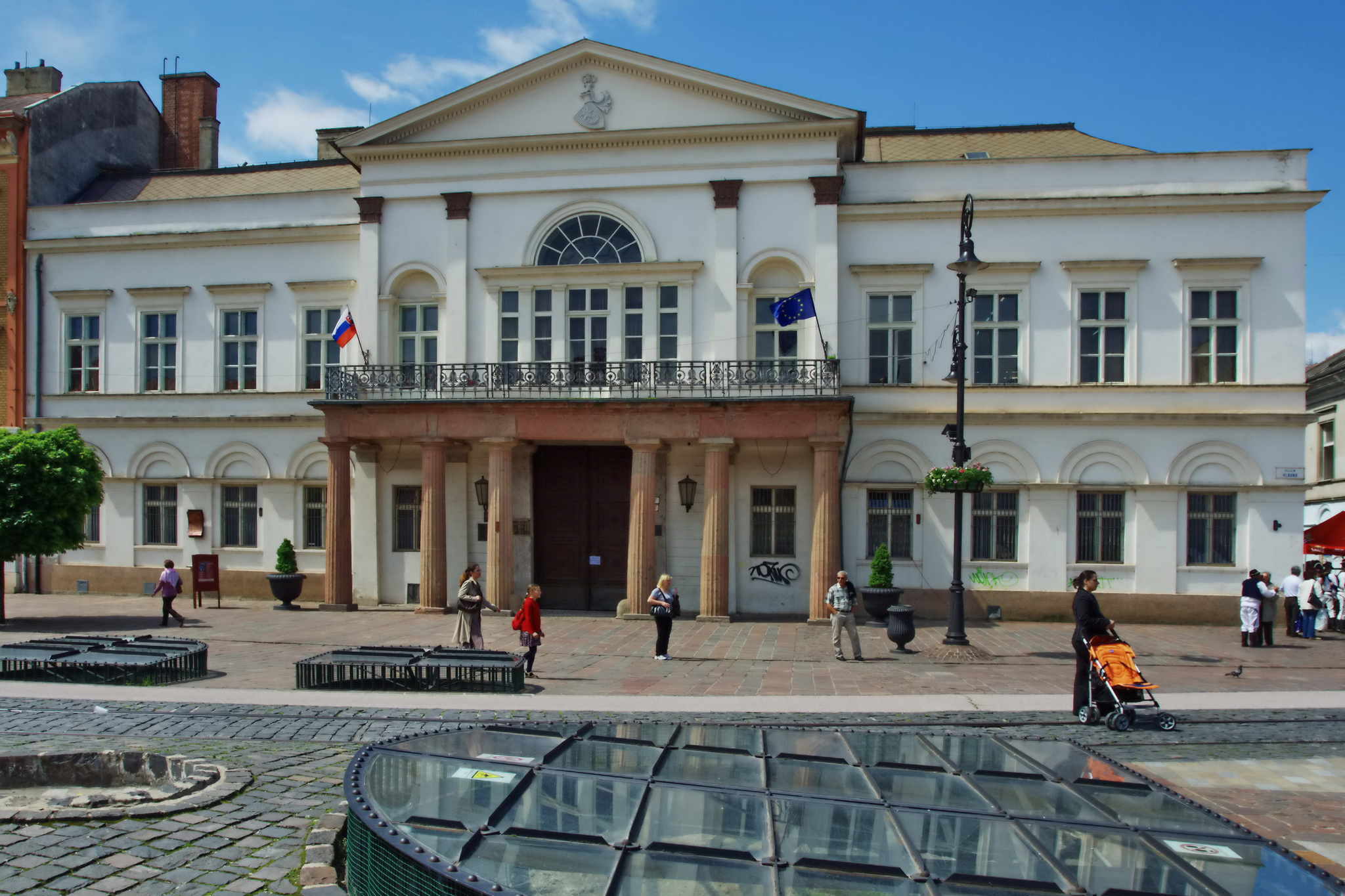
Pongrác-Forgáč Palace (State Scientific Library) in Košice (skylights of Lower Gate fortifications exhibition in the foreground)

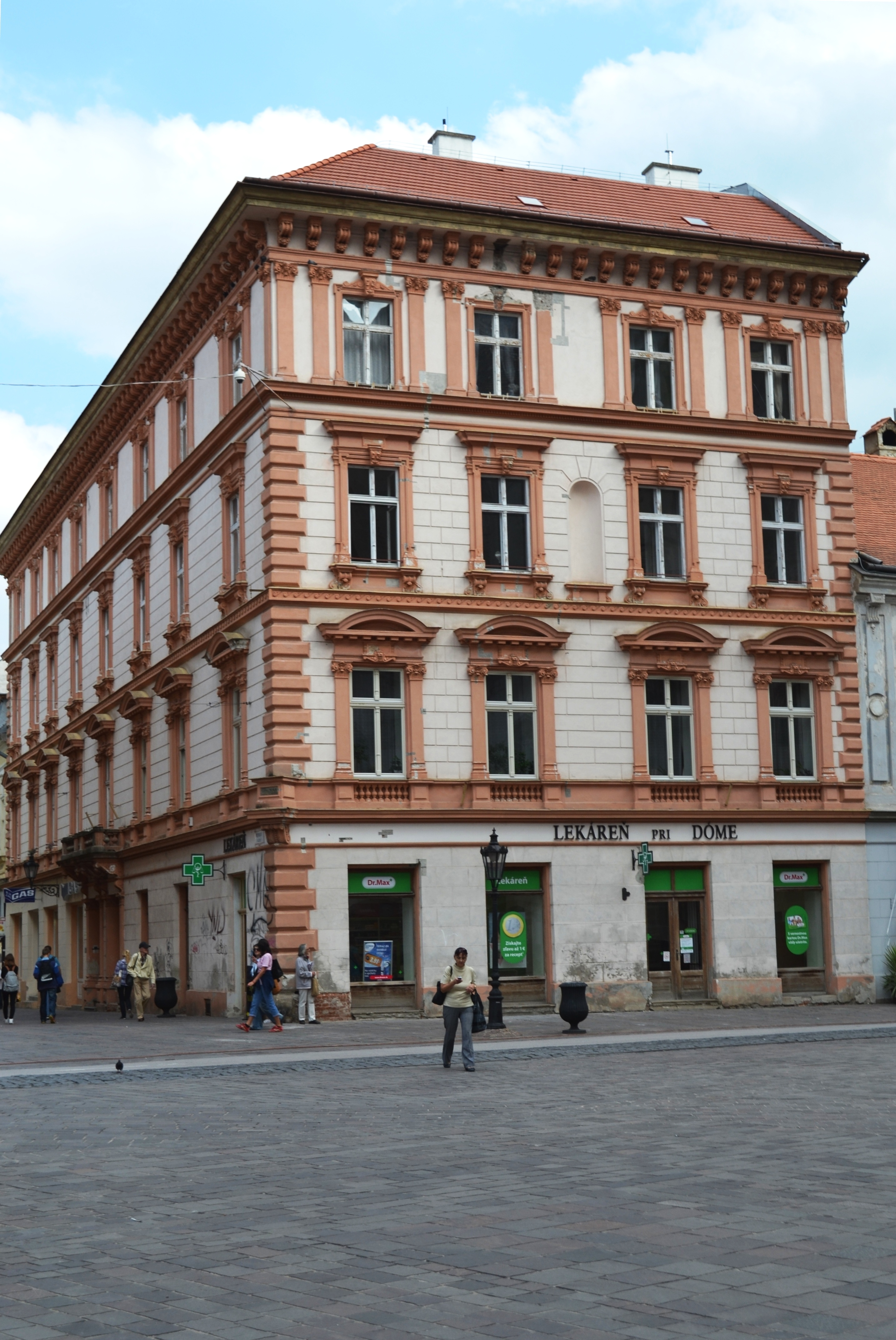
Multiple-storey building at the corner of Main Street and Mlynská Street

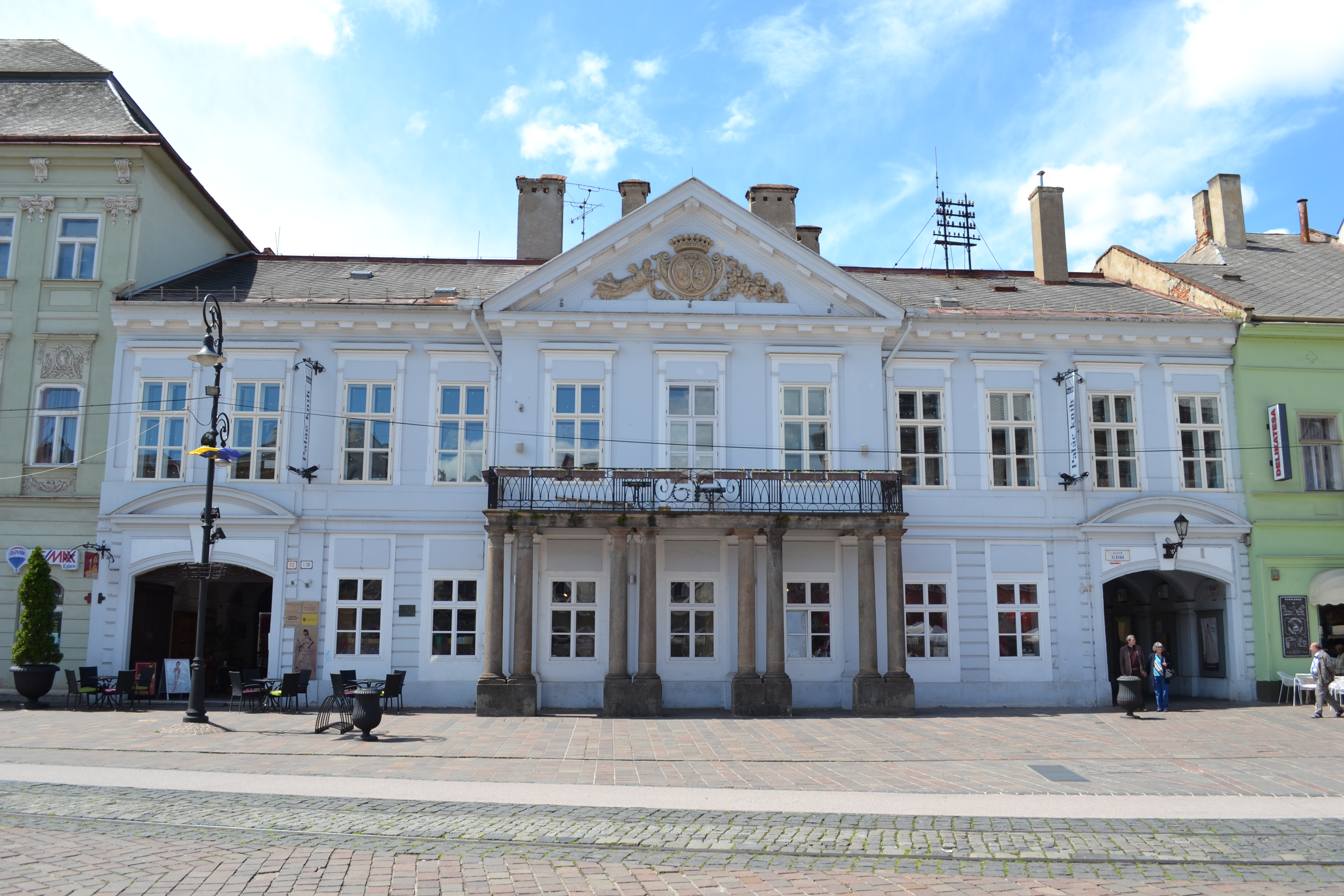
Čáky-Dezőfi palace

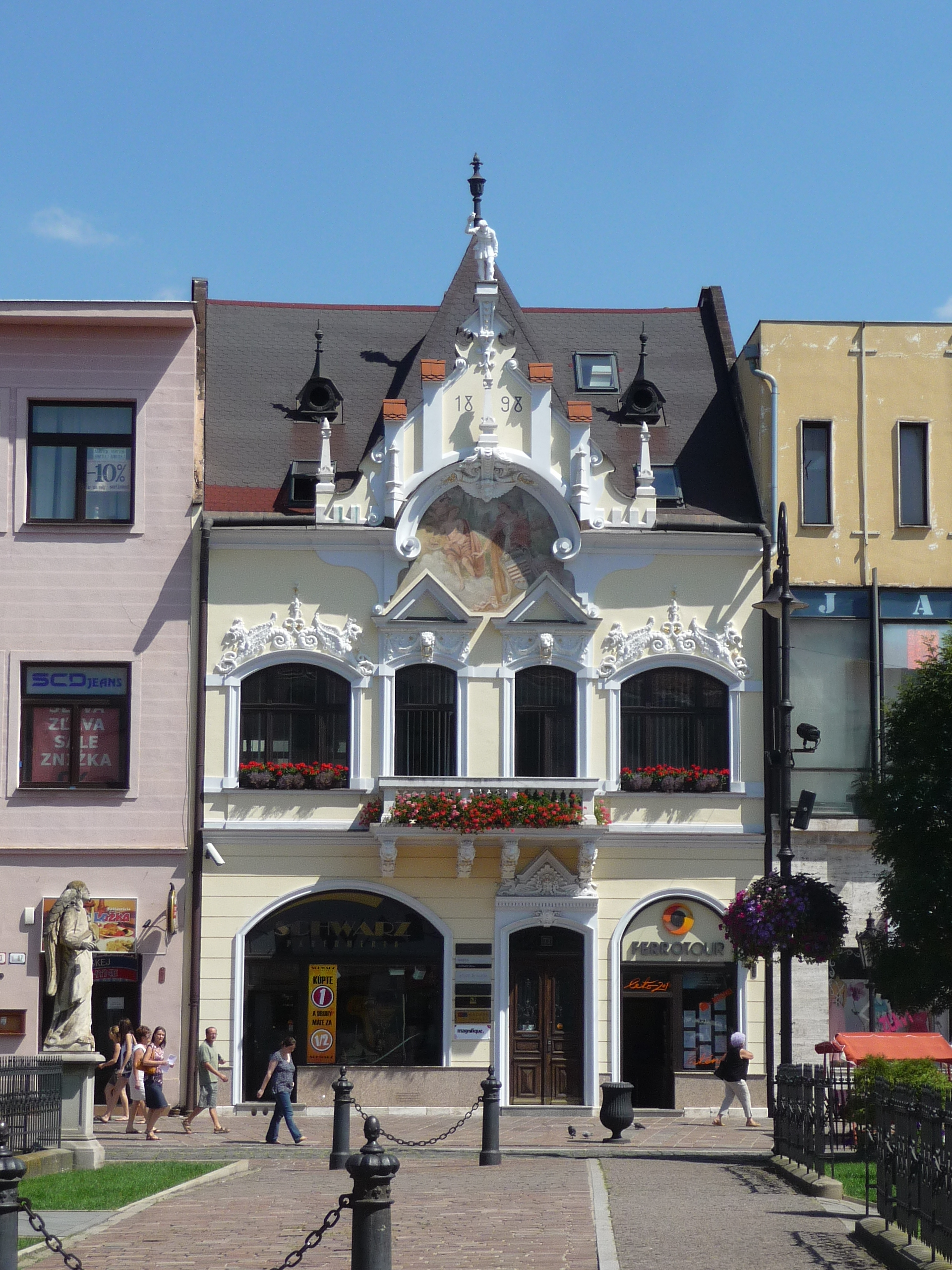
U žobráka historical townhouse

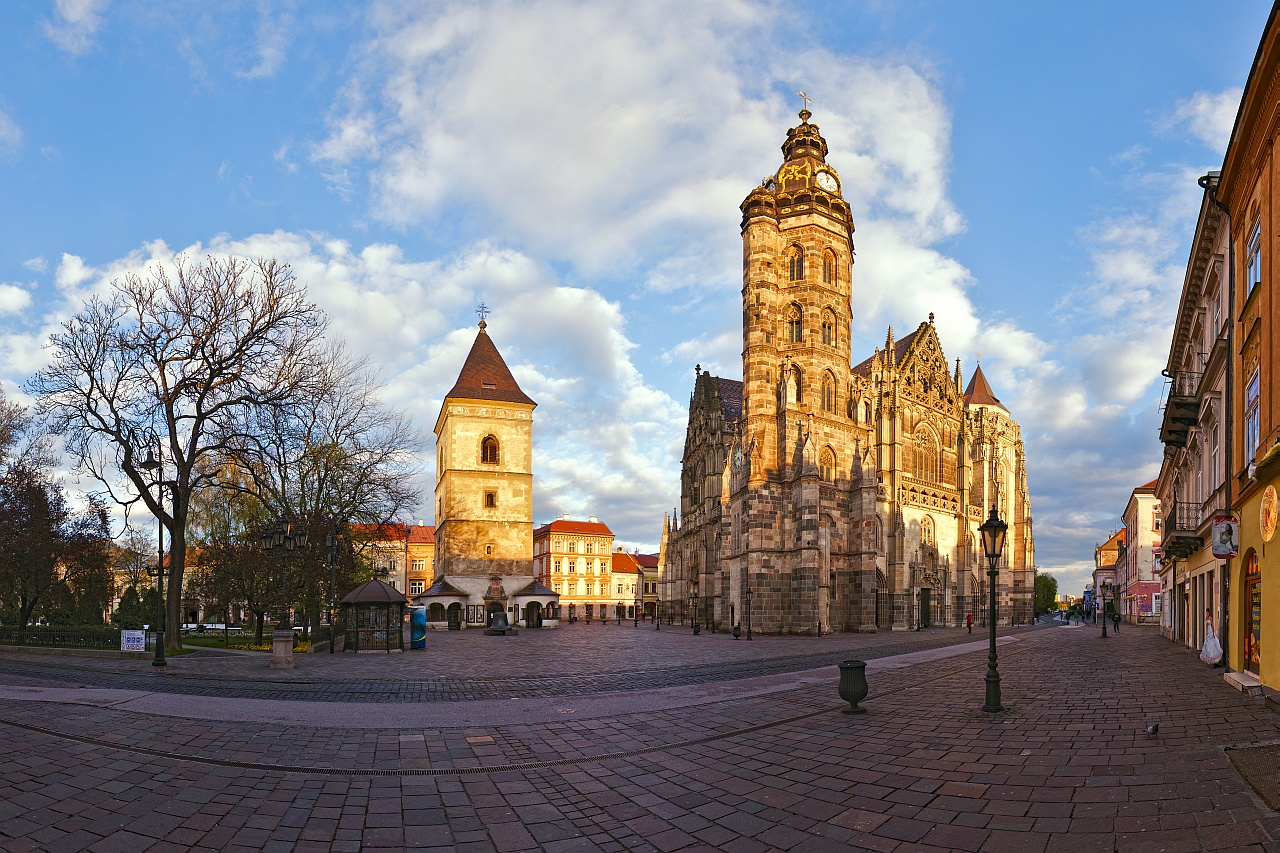
St Urban Tower and St Elisabeth's Cathedral

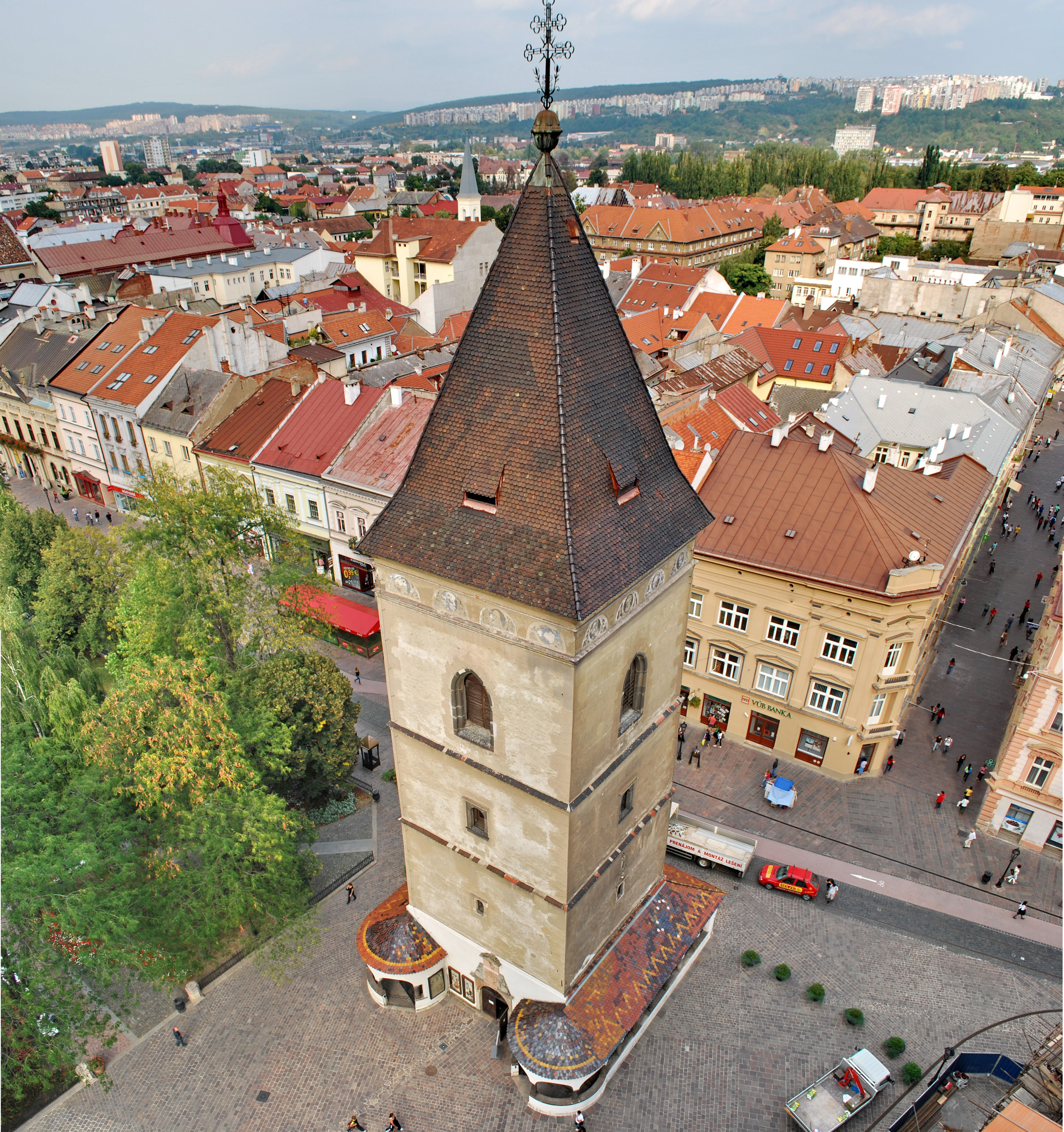
St Urban Tower

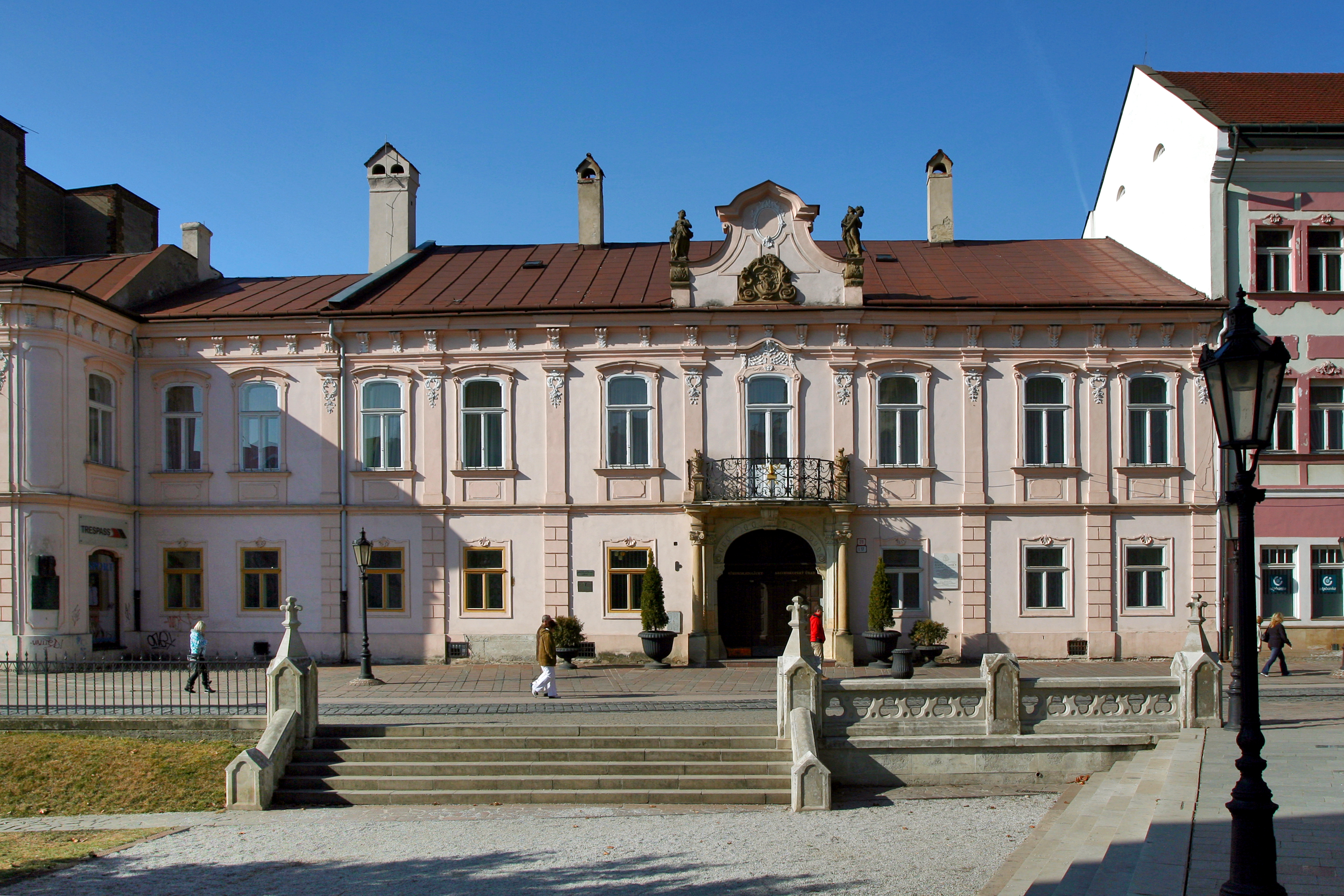
Archbishop's Palace, Košice

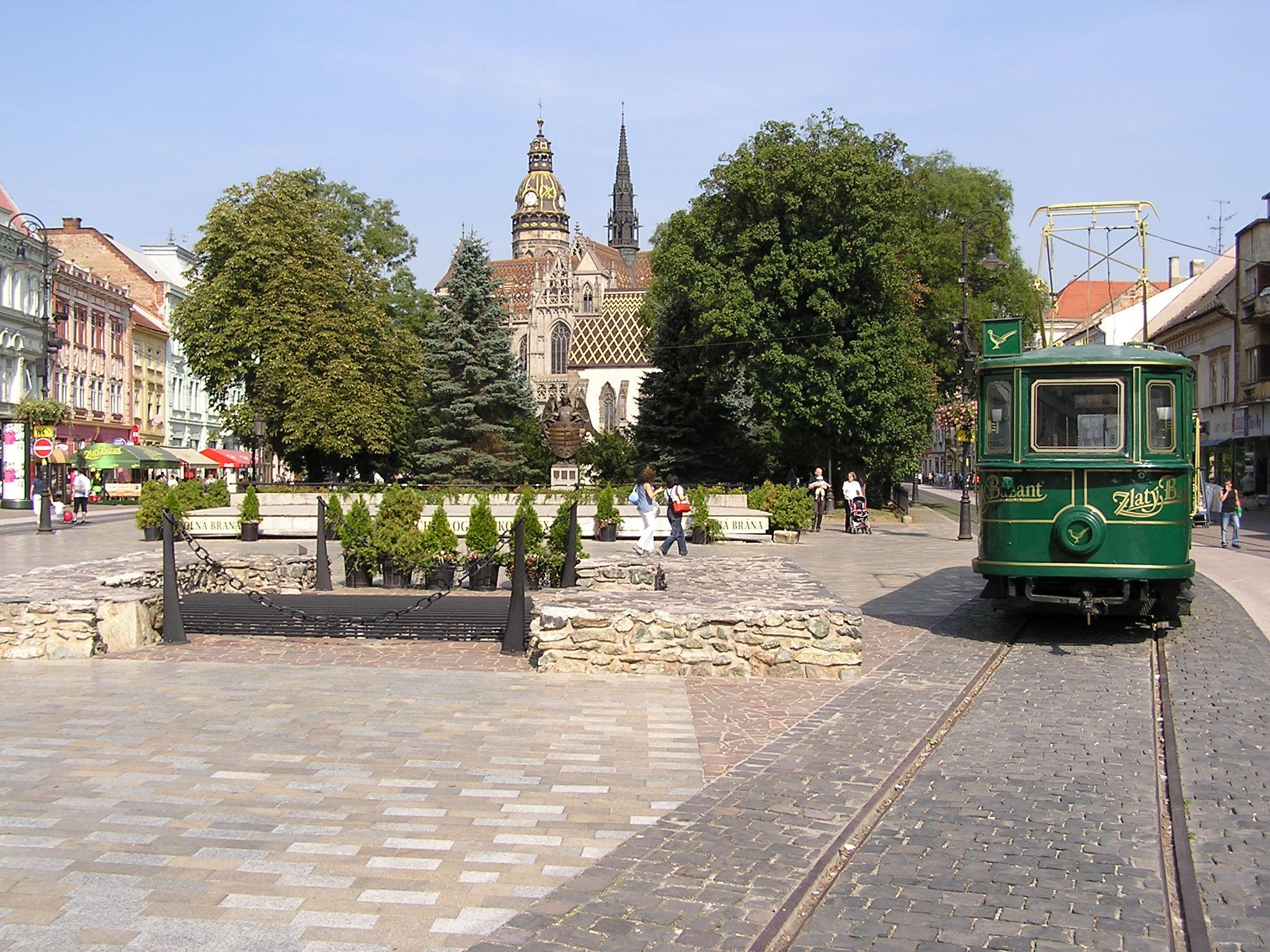
Historical tram on Main Street during an annual event

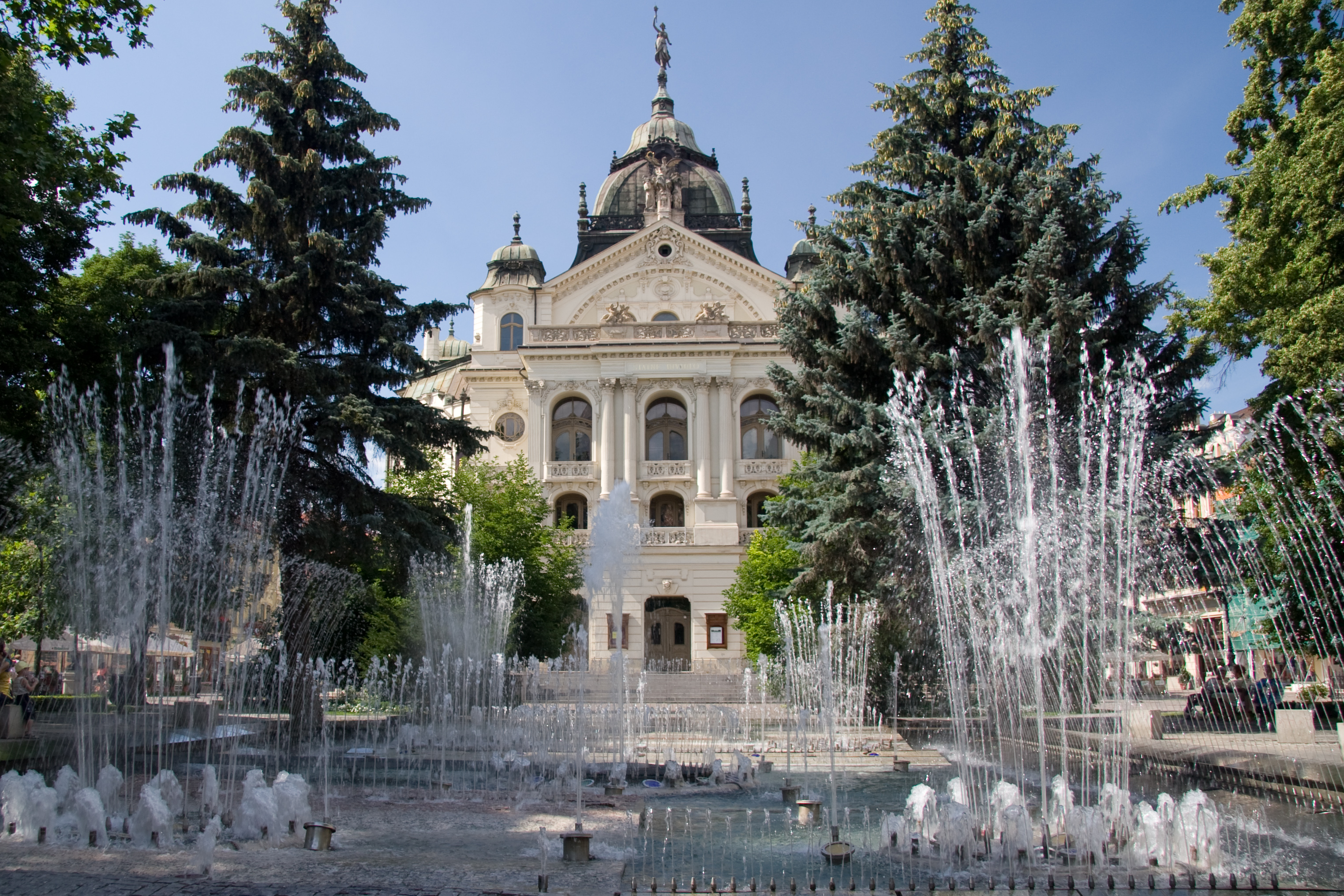
Košice State Theatre seen from park with fountains

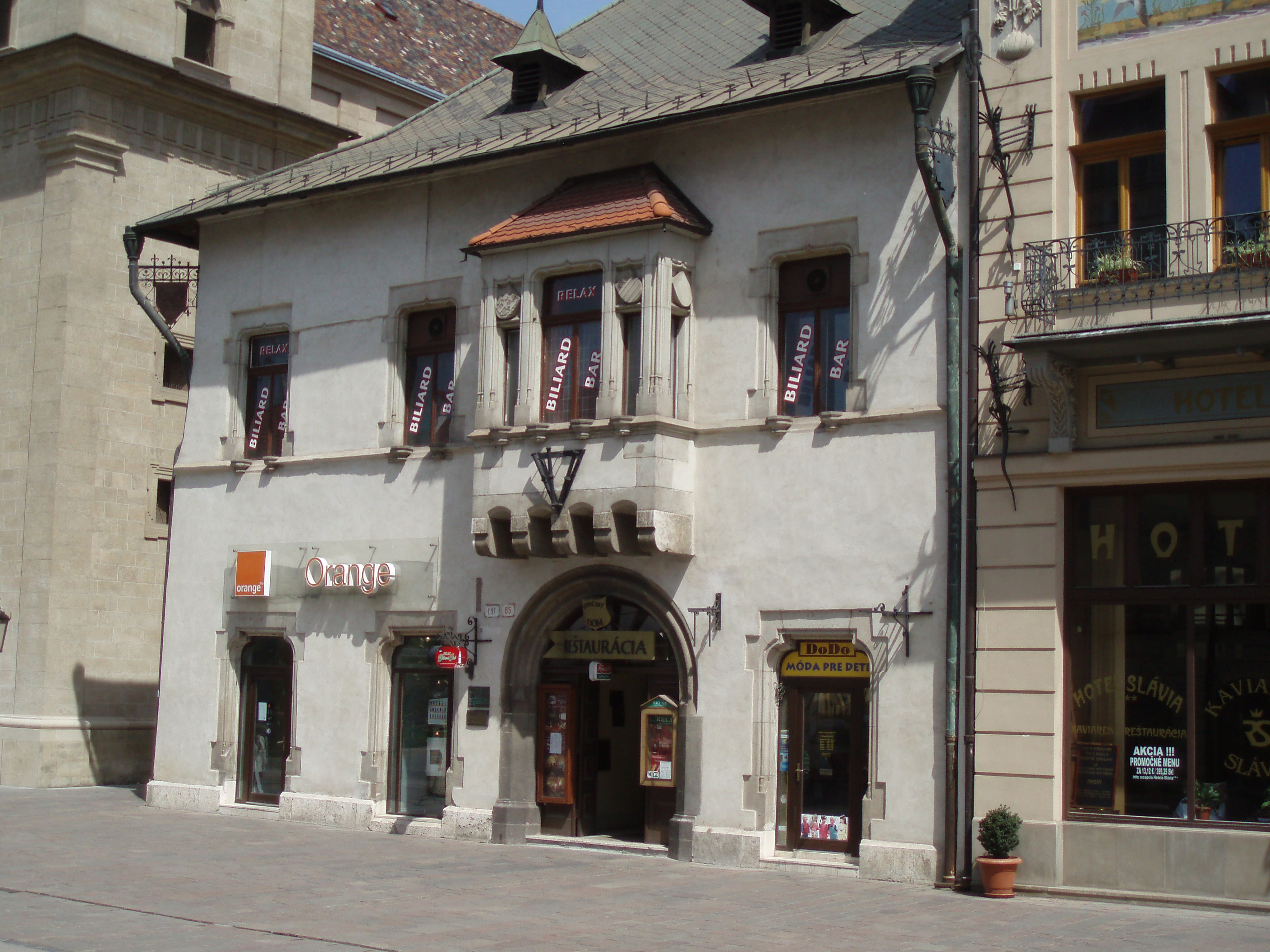
Levočský dom (Levoča House, 15th century)

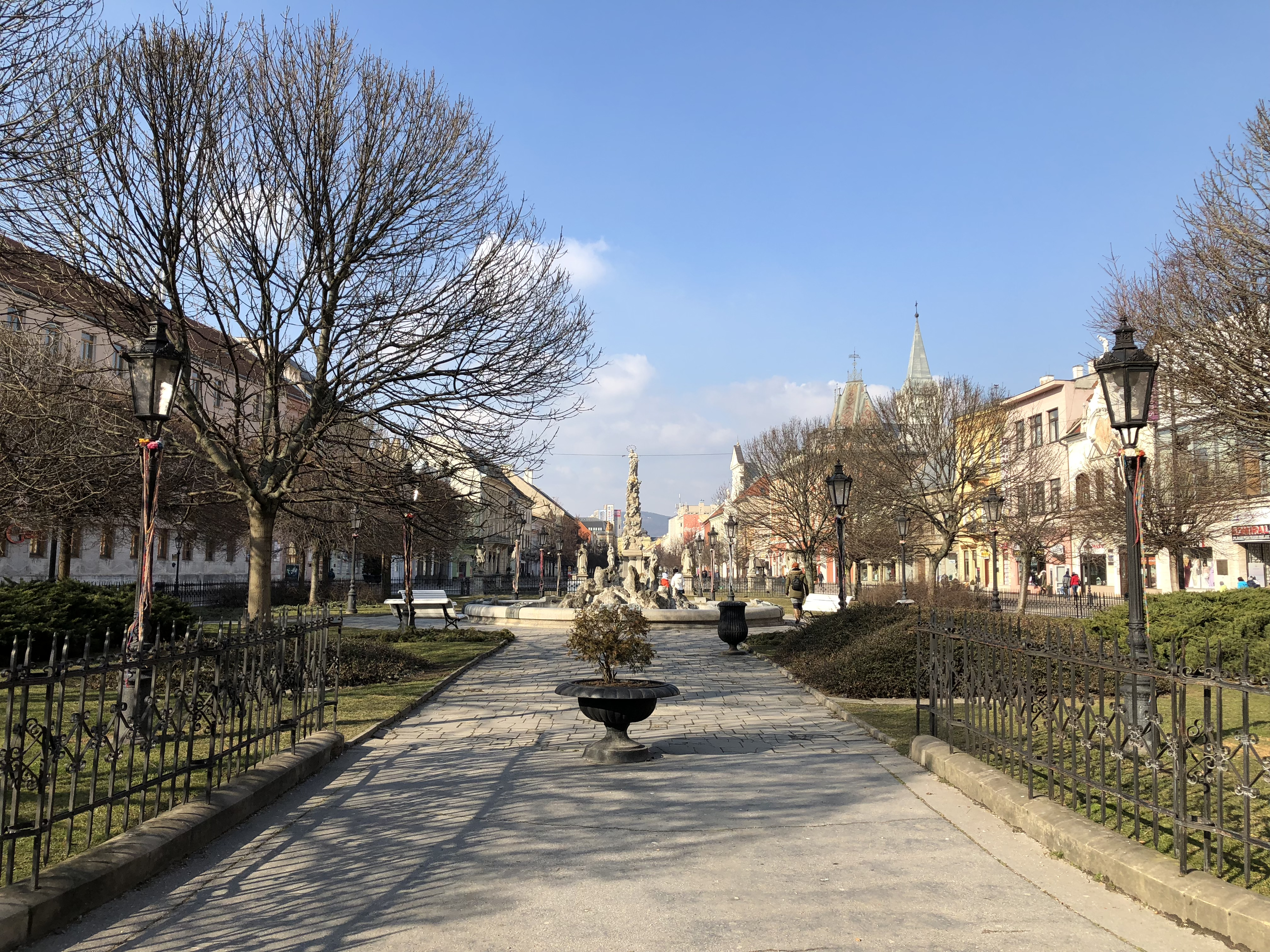
Park at the Fountain of signs (February 2018)

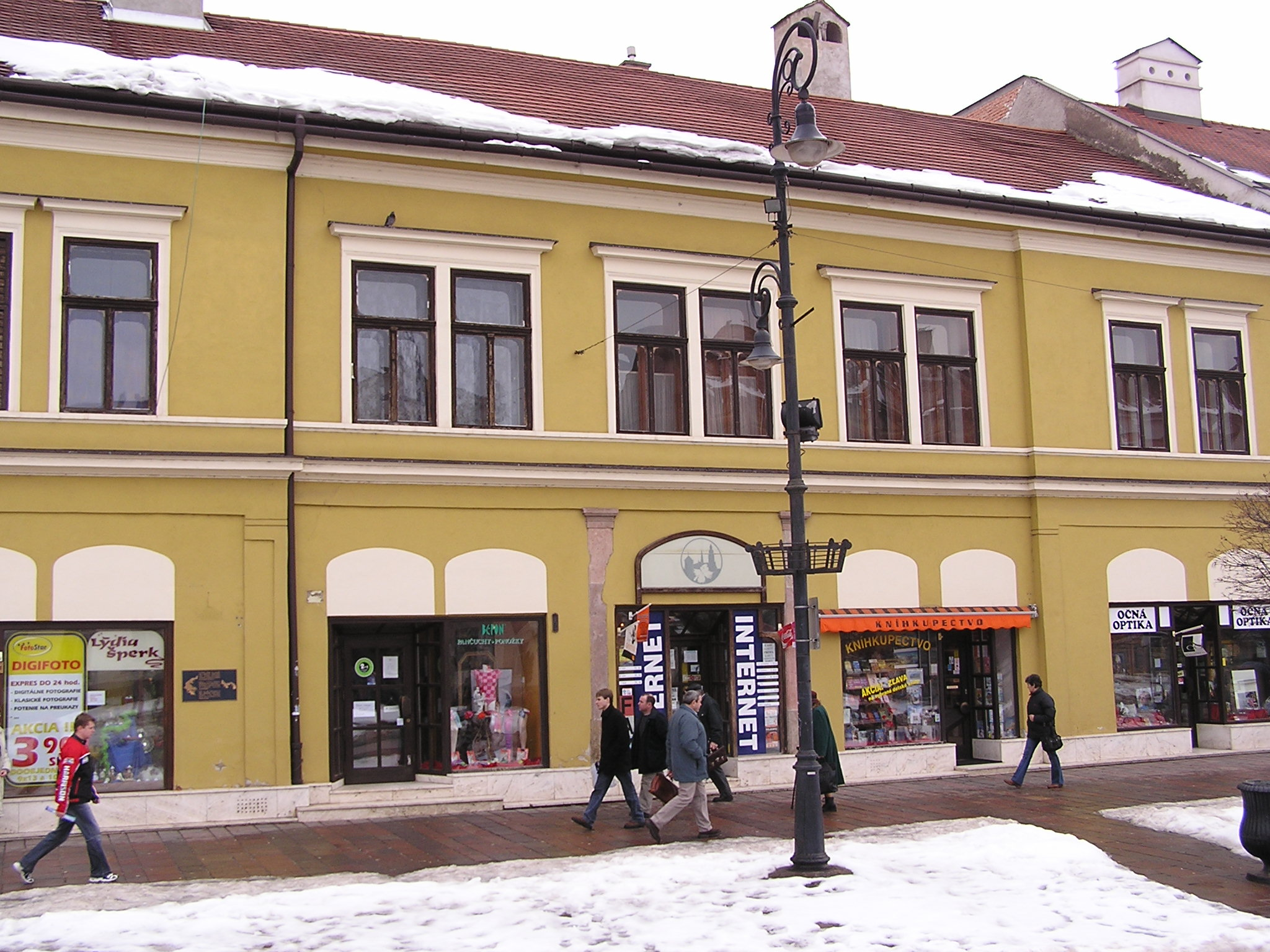
Gerster's House

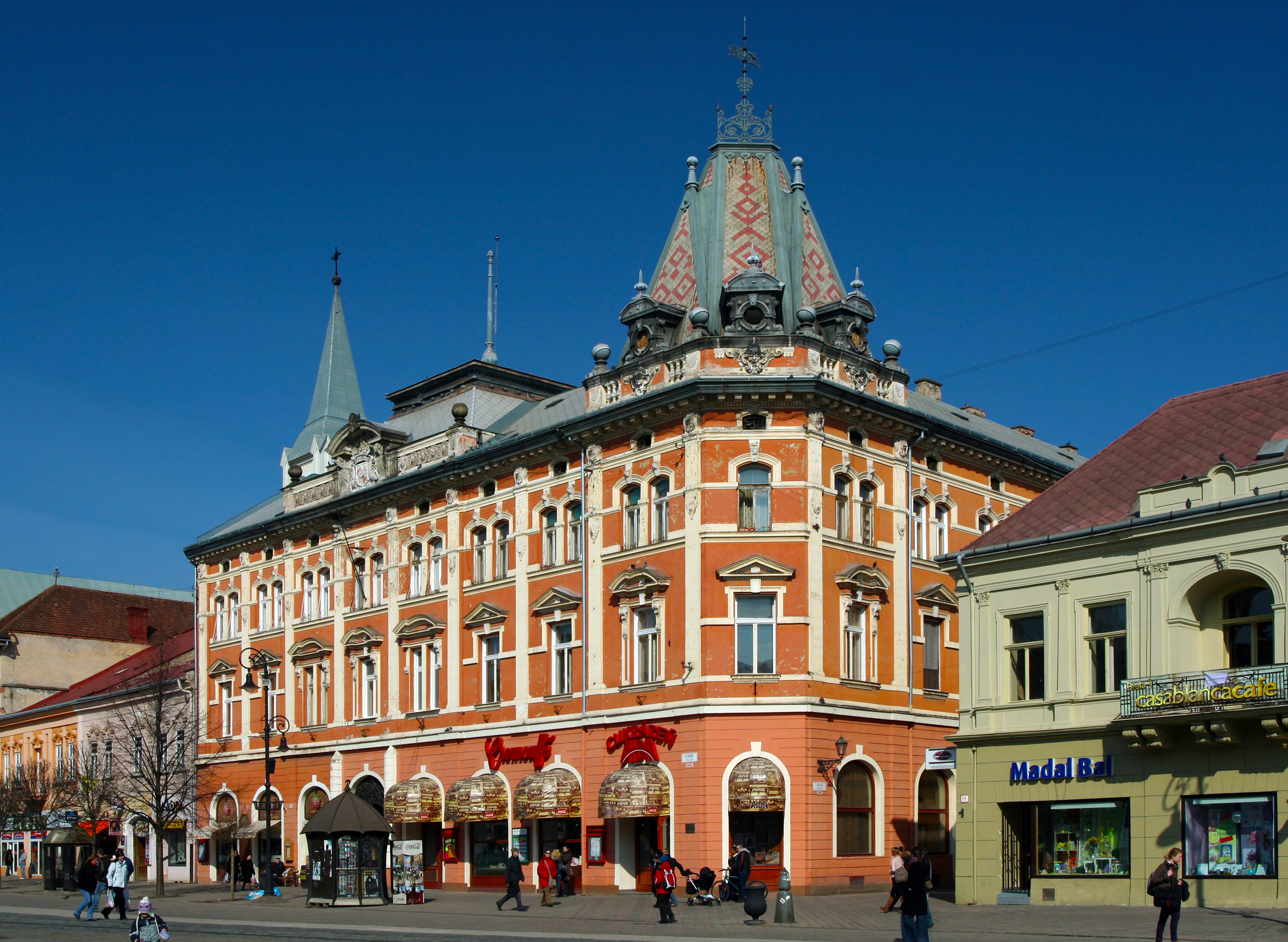
Andrássy Palace

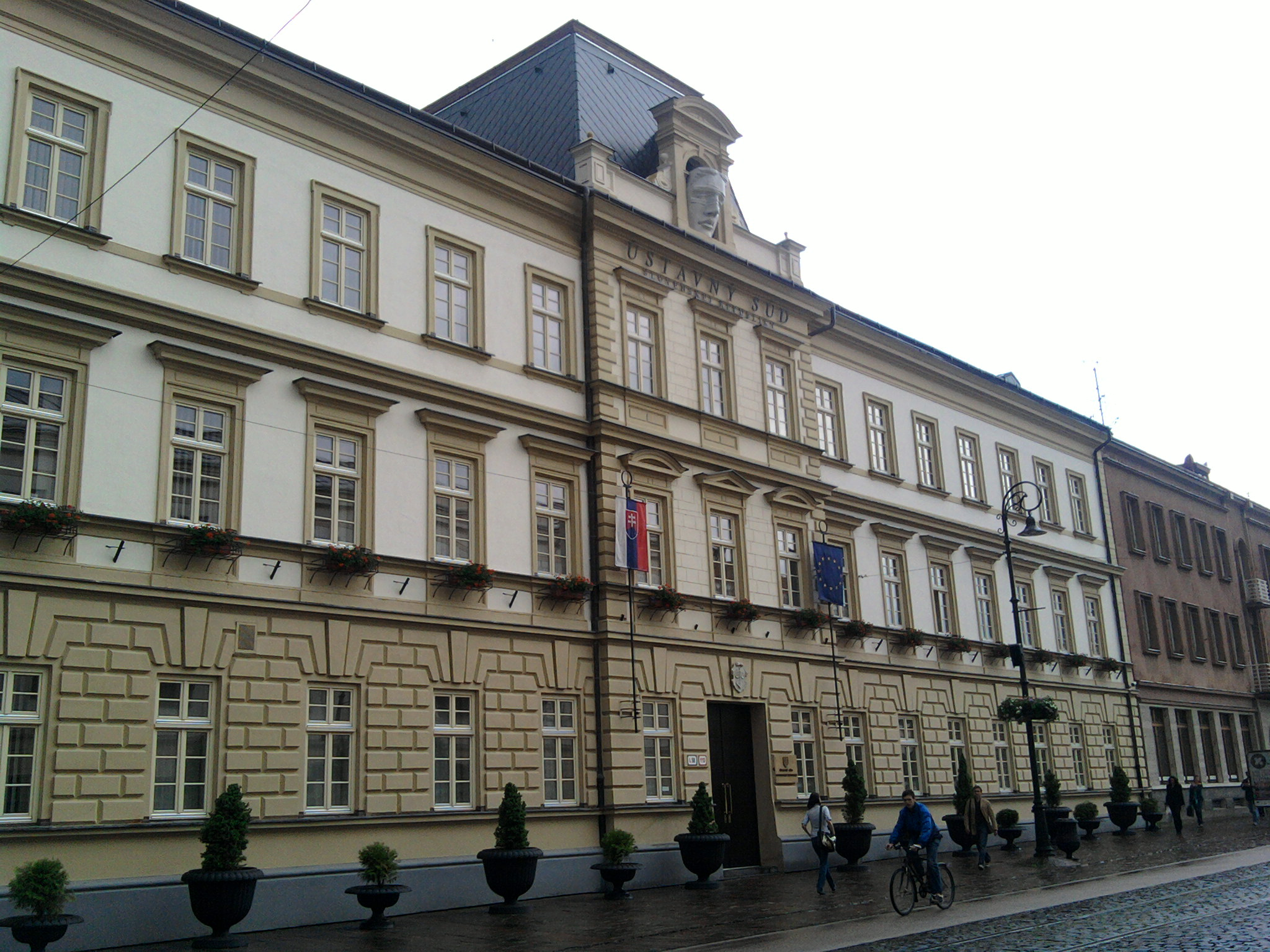
Building of the Constitutional Court of the Slovak Republic

Other Old Town streets and squares

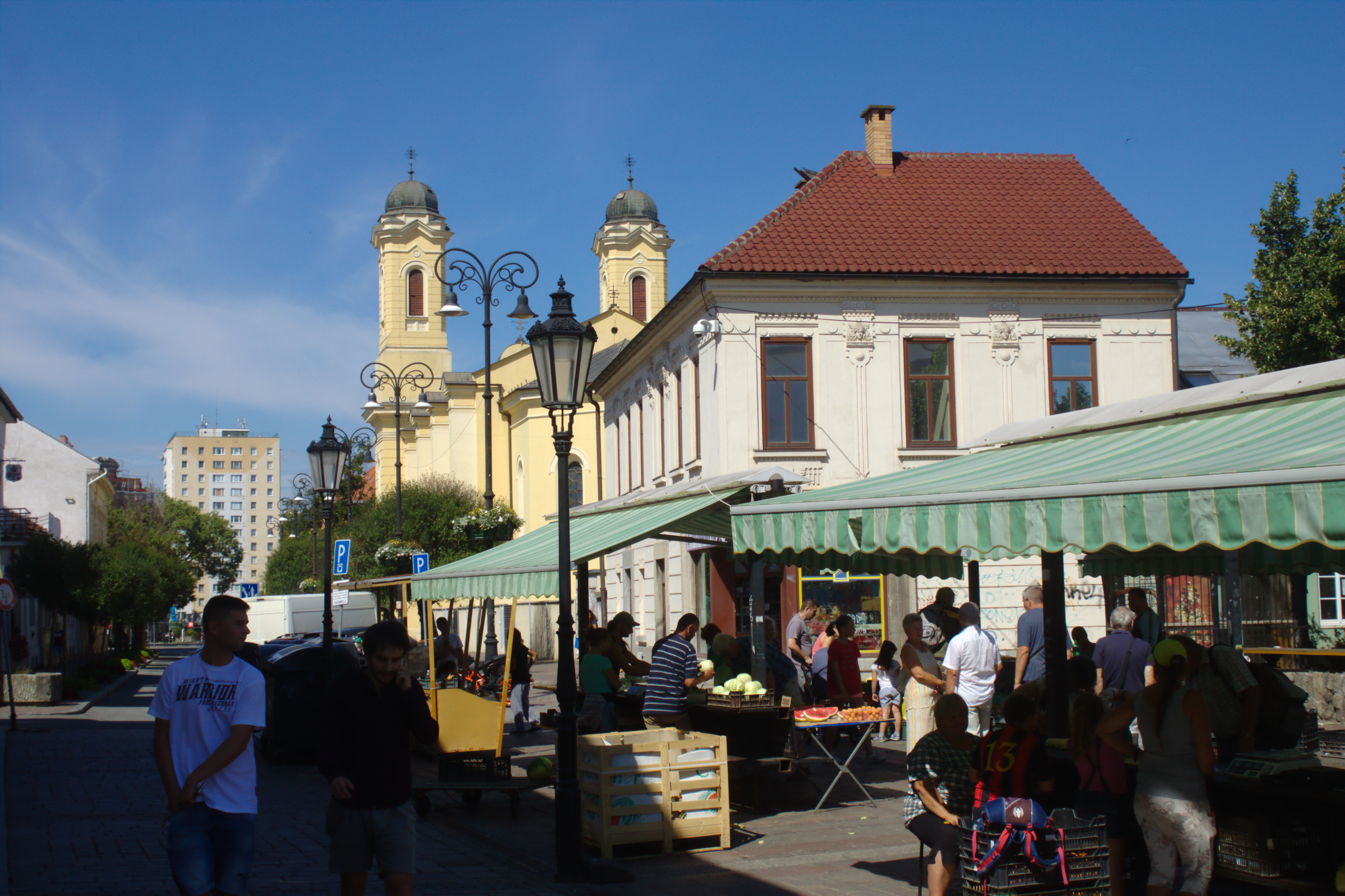
Marketplace on Dominican Square

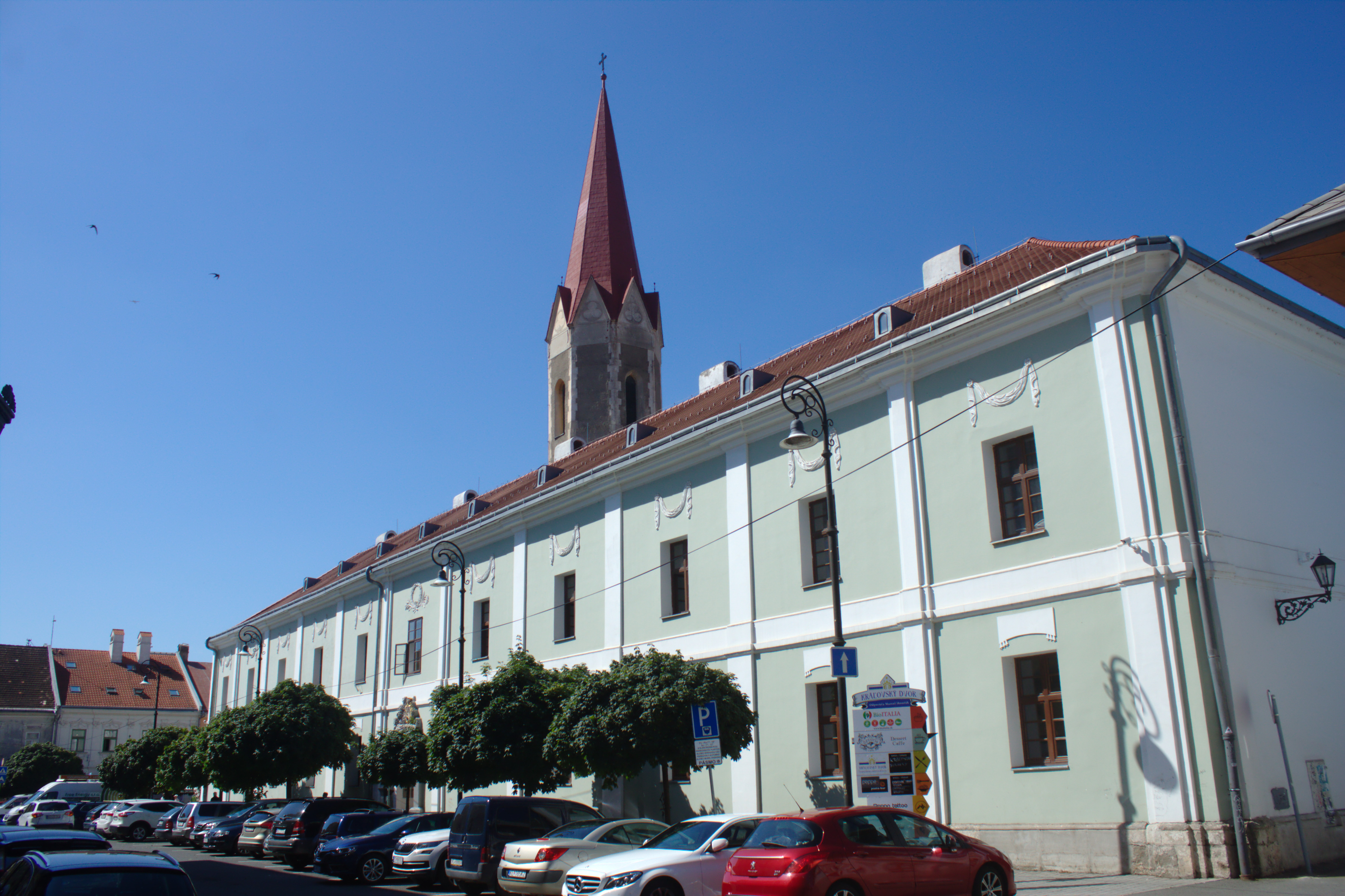
Historic building on Dominican Square, the Dominican Church in the background

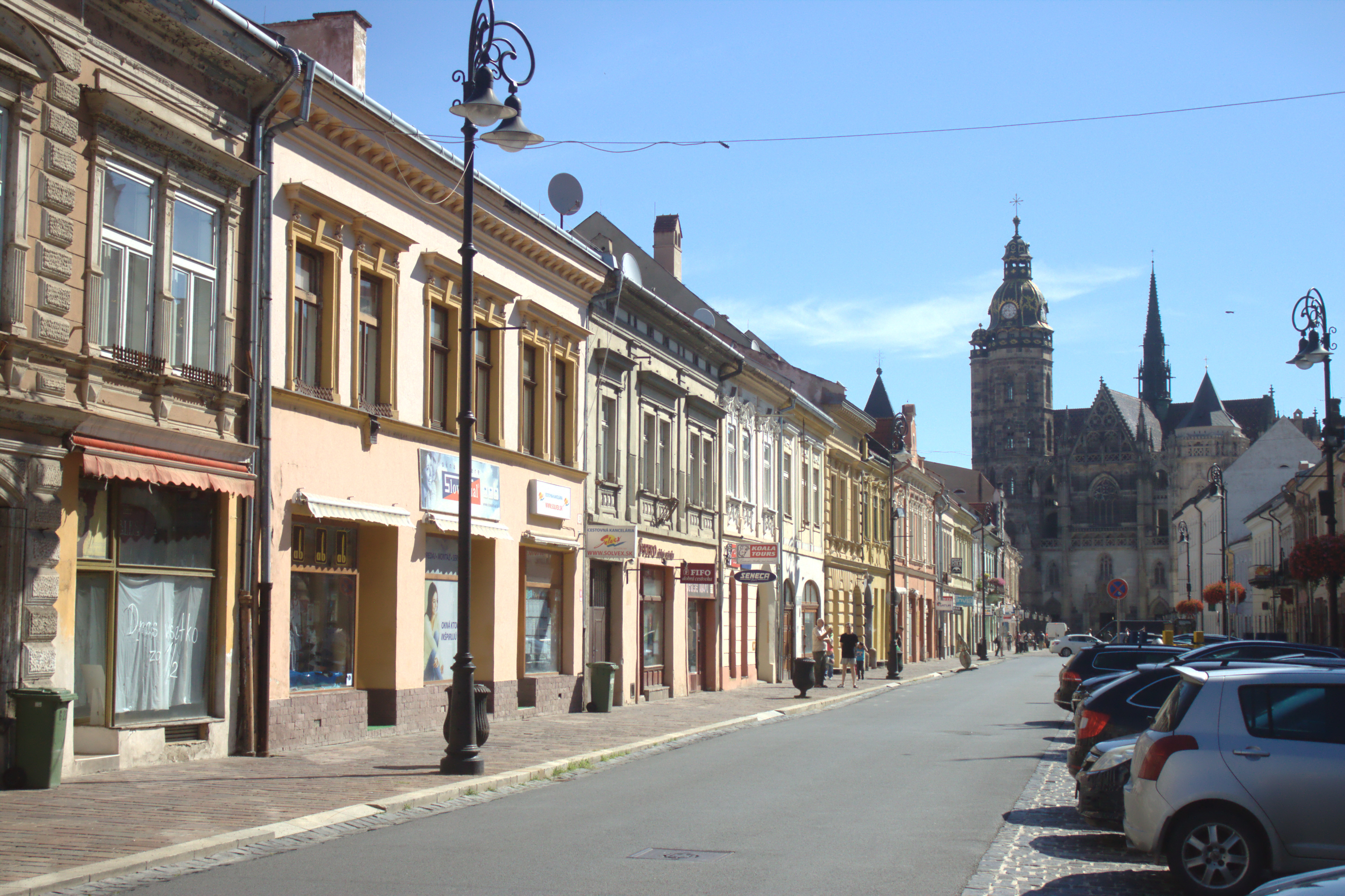
Alžbetina (Elisabeth's) Street, with the Cathedral of St Elisabeth in the distance

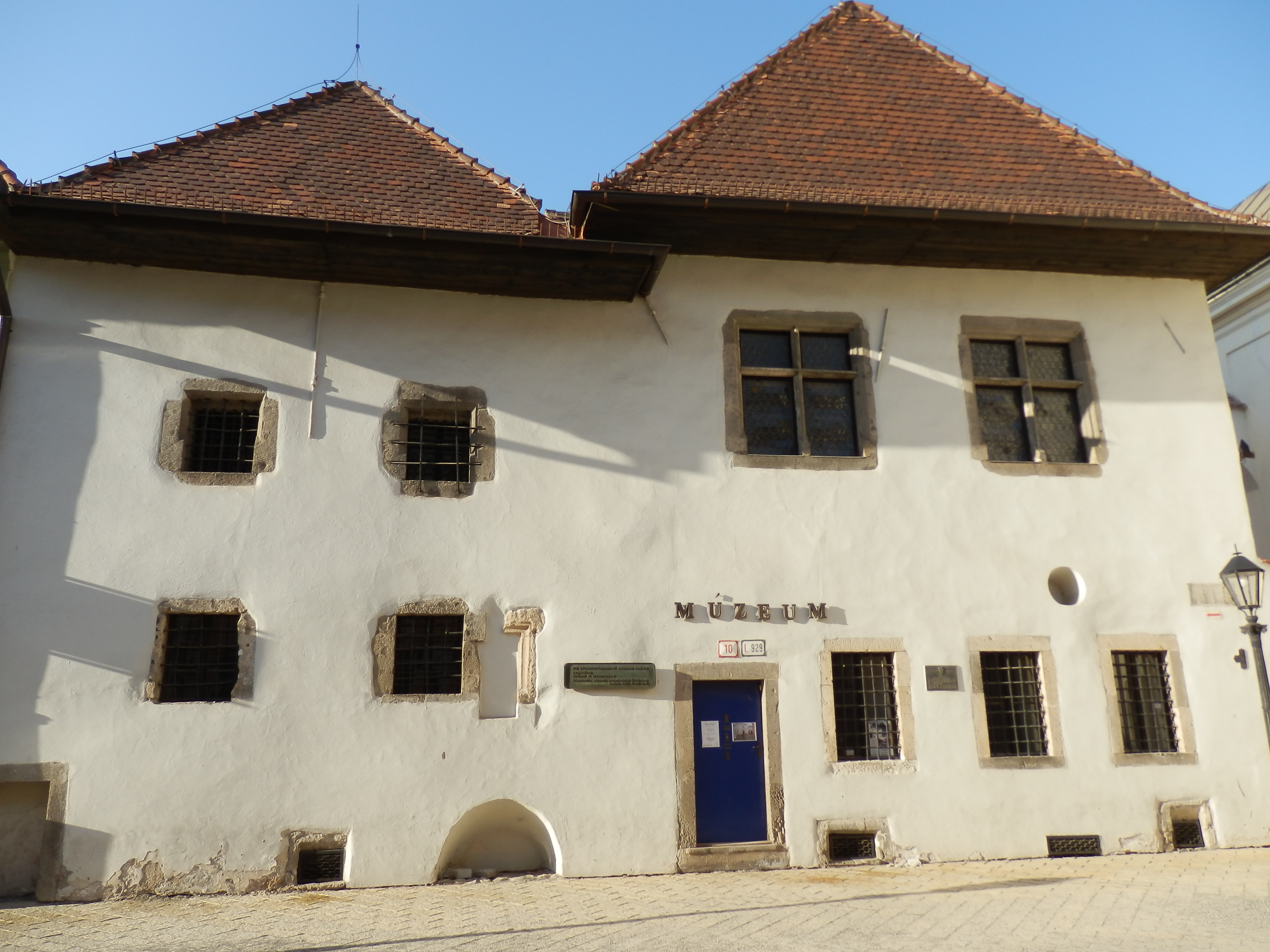
Mikluš's Prison at the corner of Pri Miklušovej väznici and Hrnčiarska streets

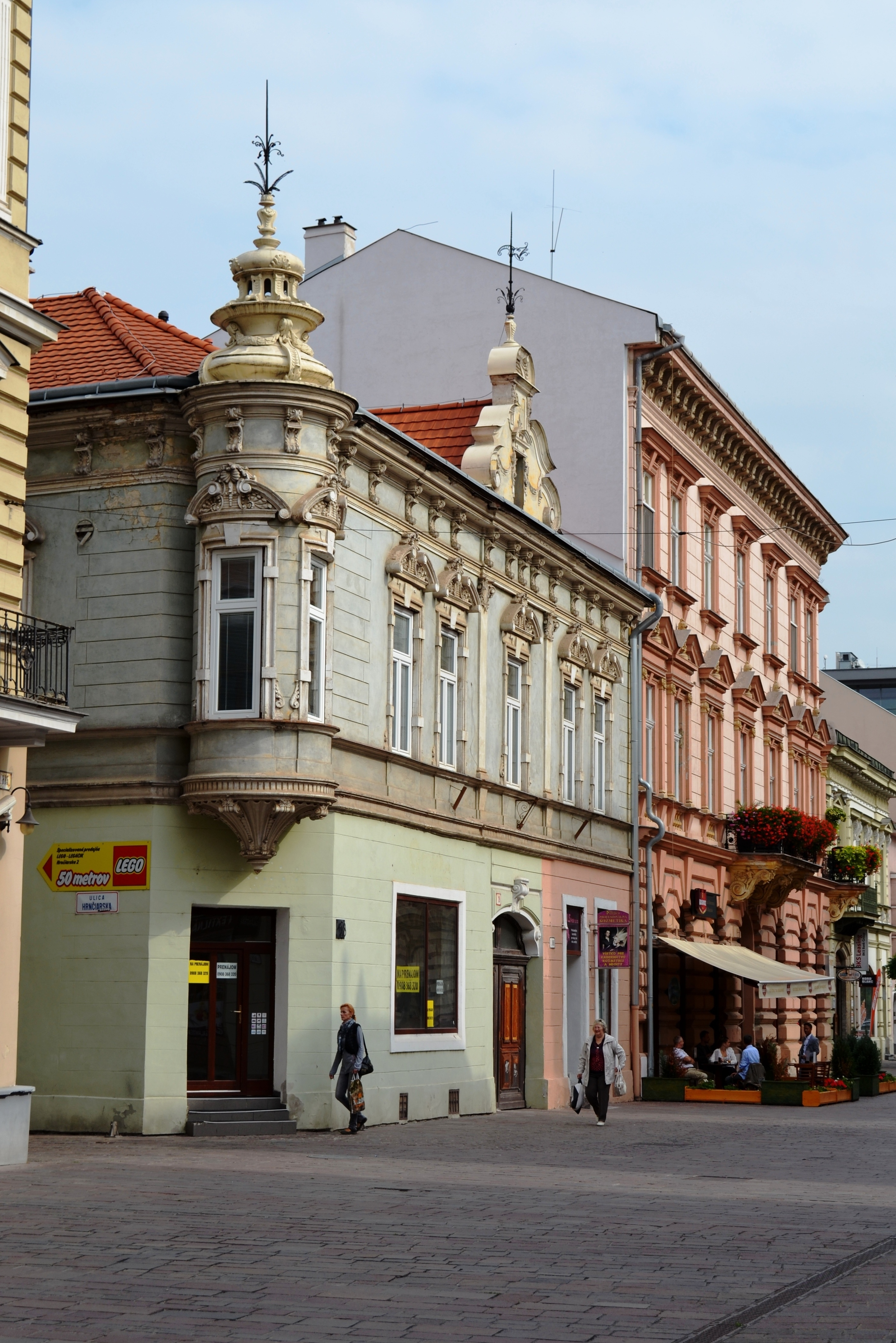
Shops and public buildings on Mlynská (Mill) Street

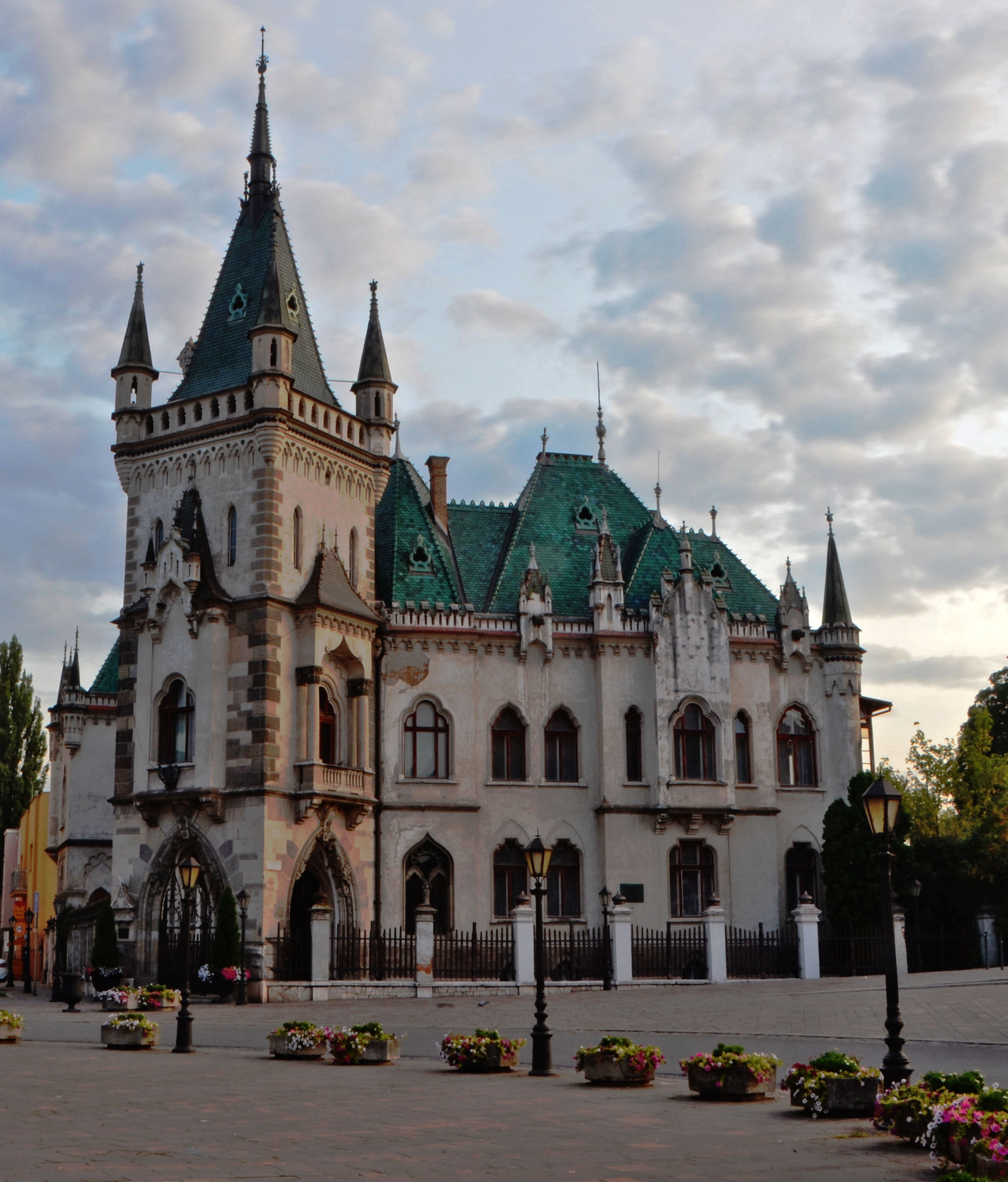
Jakab Palace (Mlynská Street)

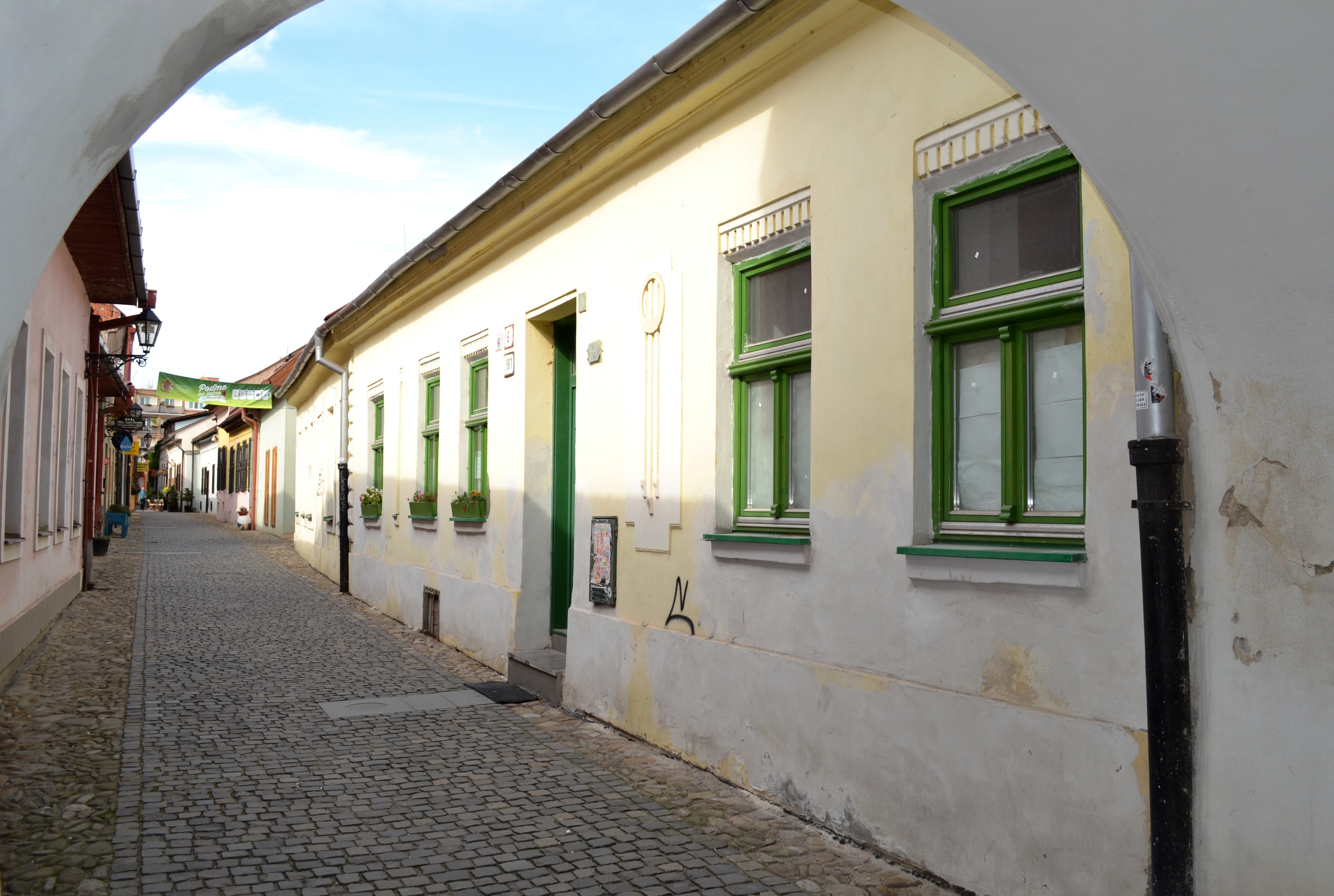
Hrnčiarska (Potter's) Street, nowadays home to the Craftsman's Lane series of workshops

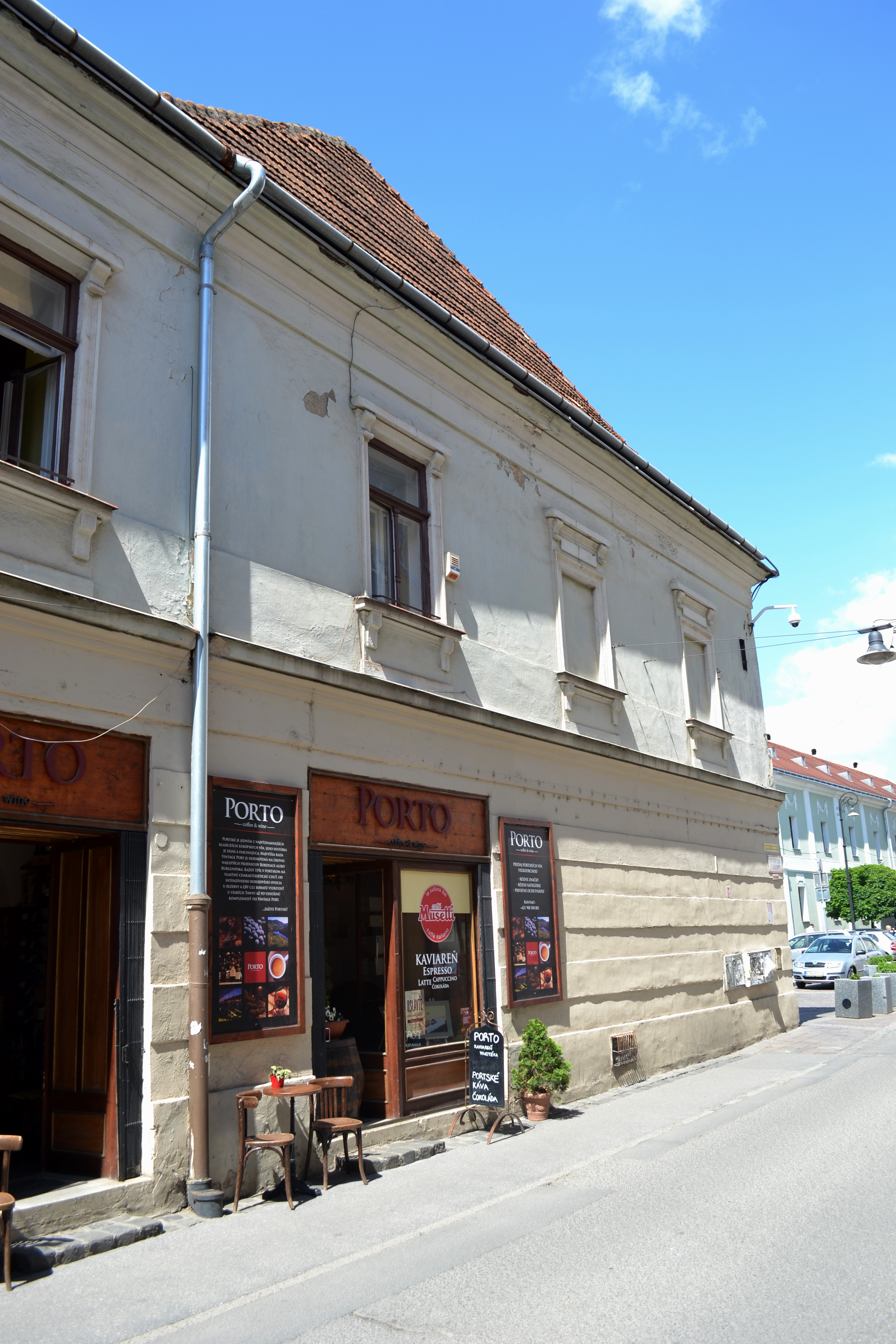
Mäsiarska (Butcher's) Street

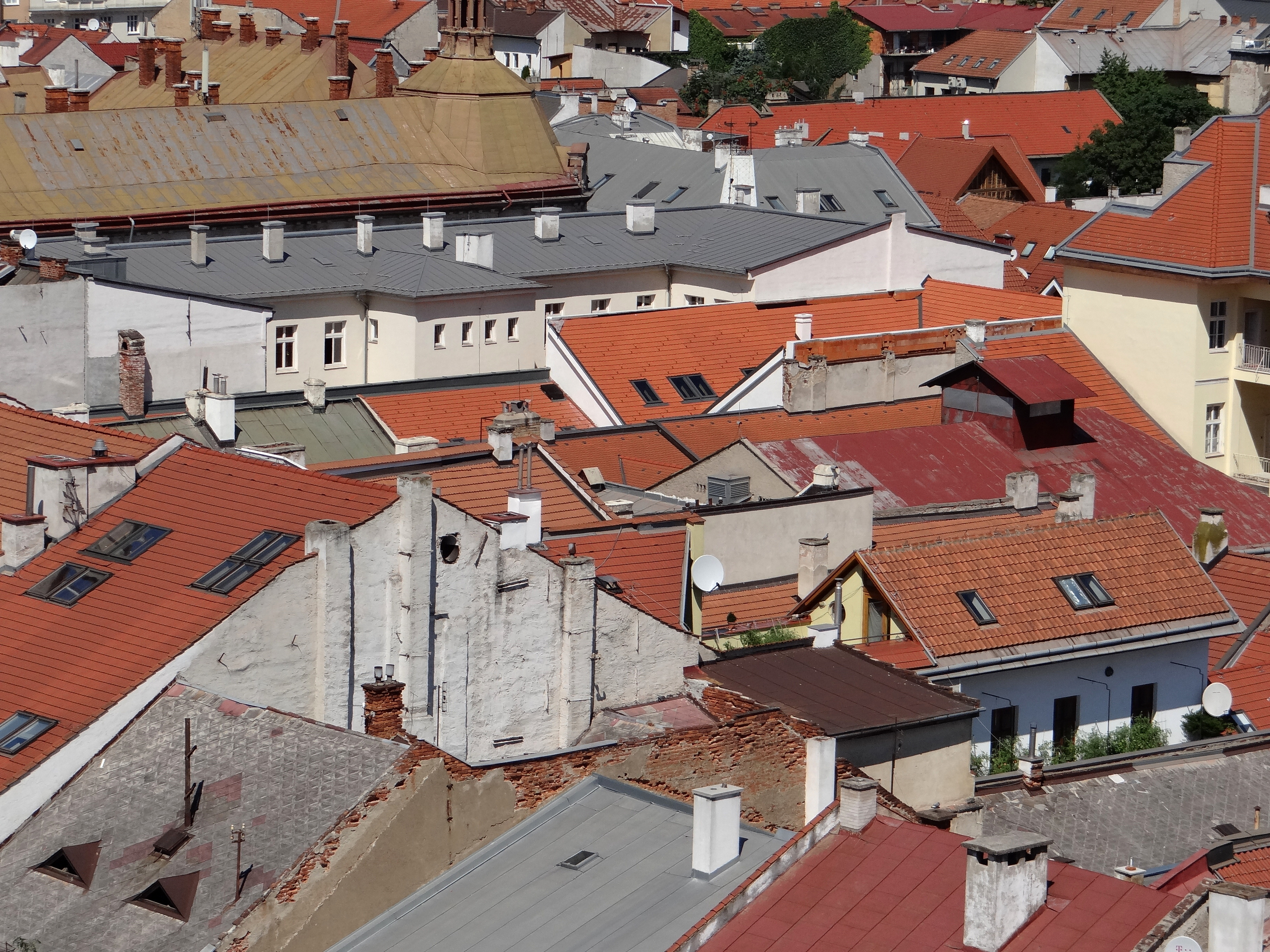
The rooftops of the Old Town

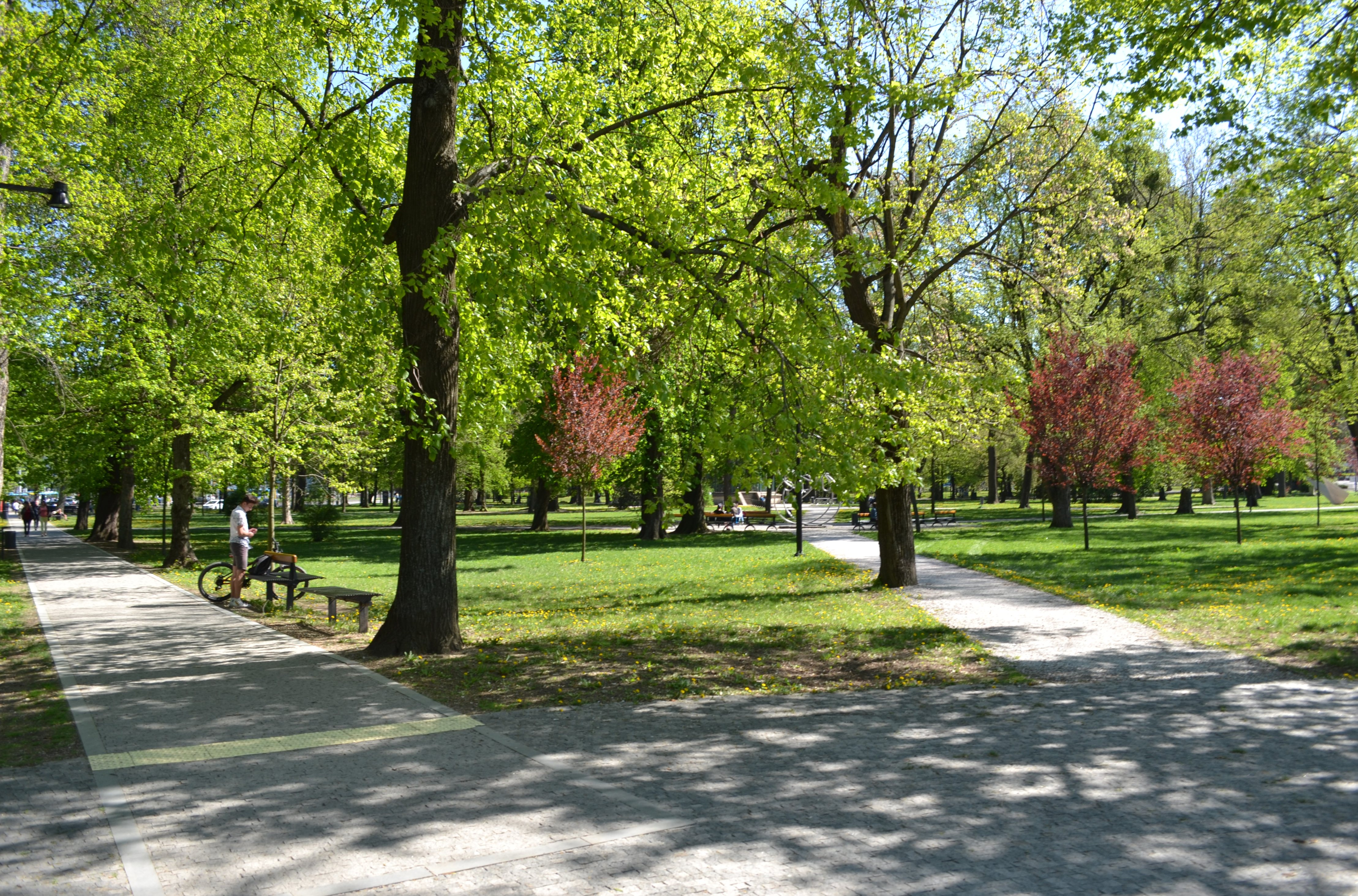
Mestský park (City Park), between Staničné námestie and Mlynská Street

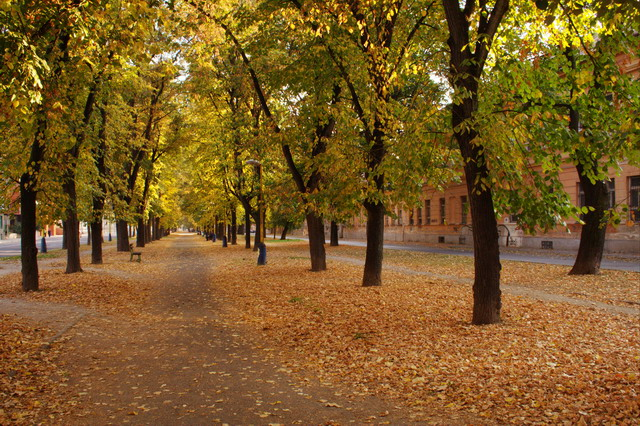
Park at Moyzesova Street

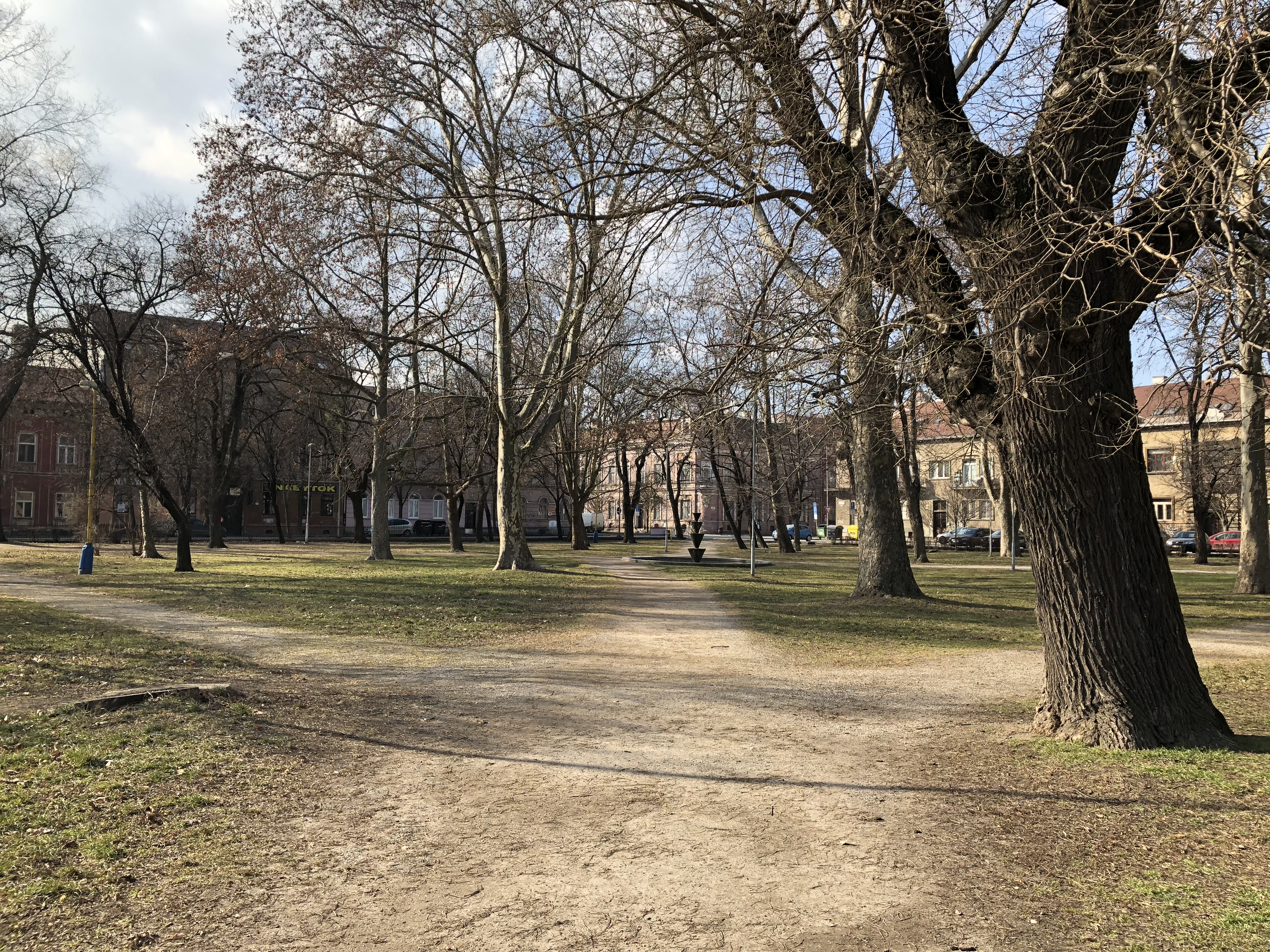
Park at Drevný trh

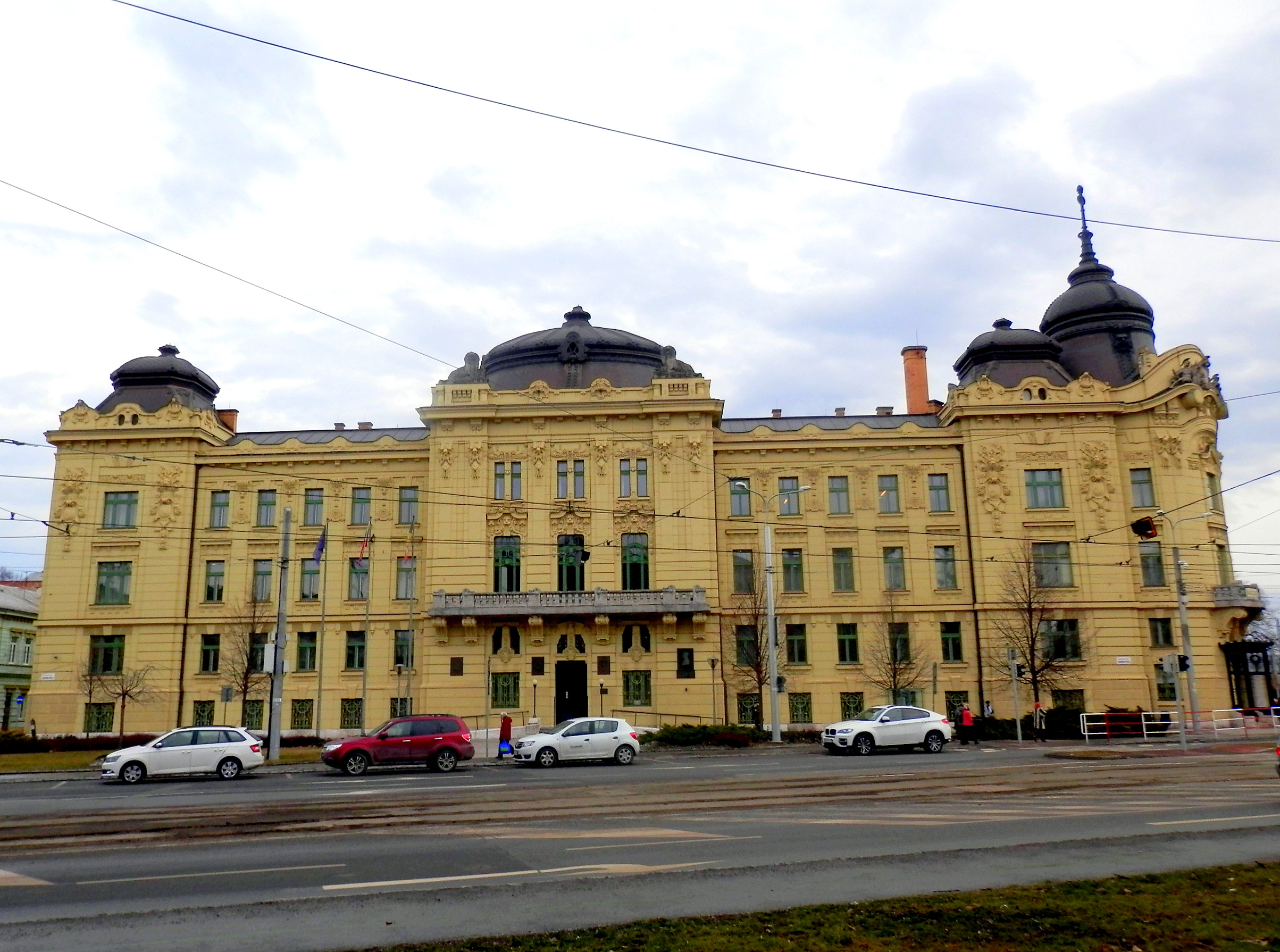
Administrative building at Námestie maratóncov (Marathon Runners' Square)

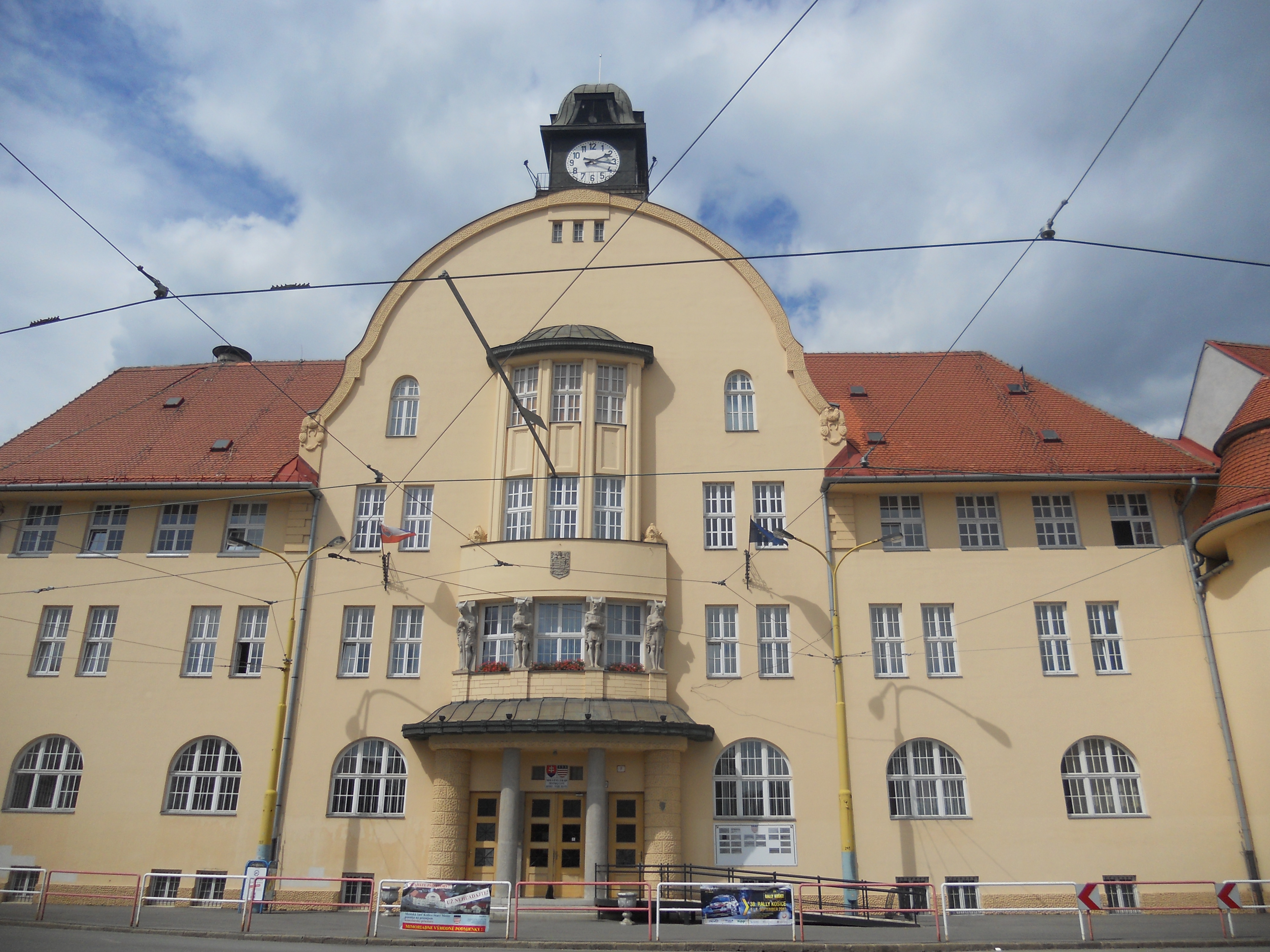
Administrative building on Hviezdoslavova Street

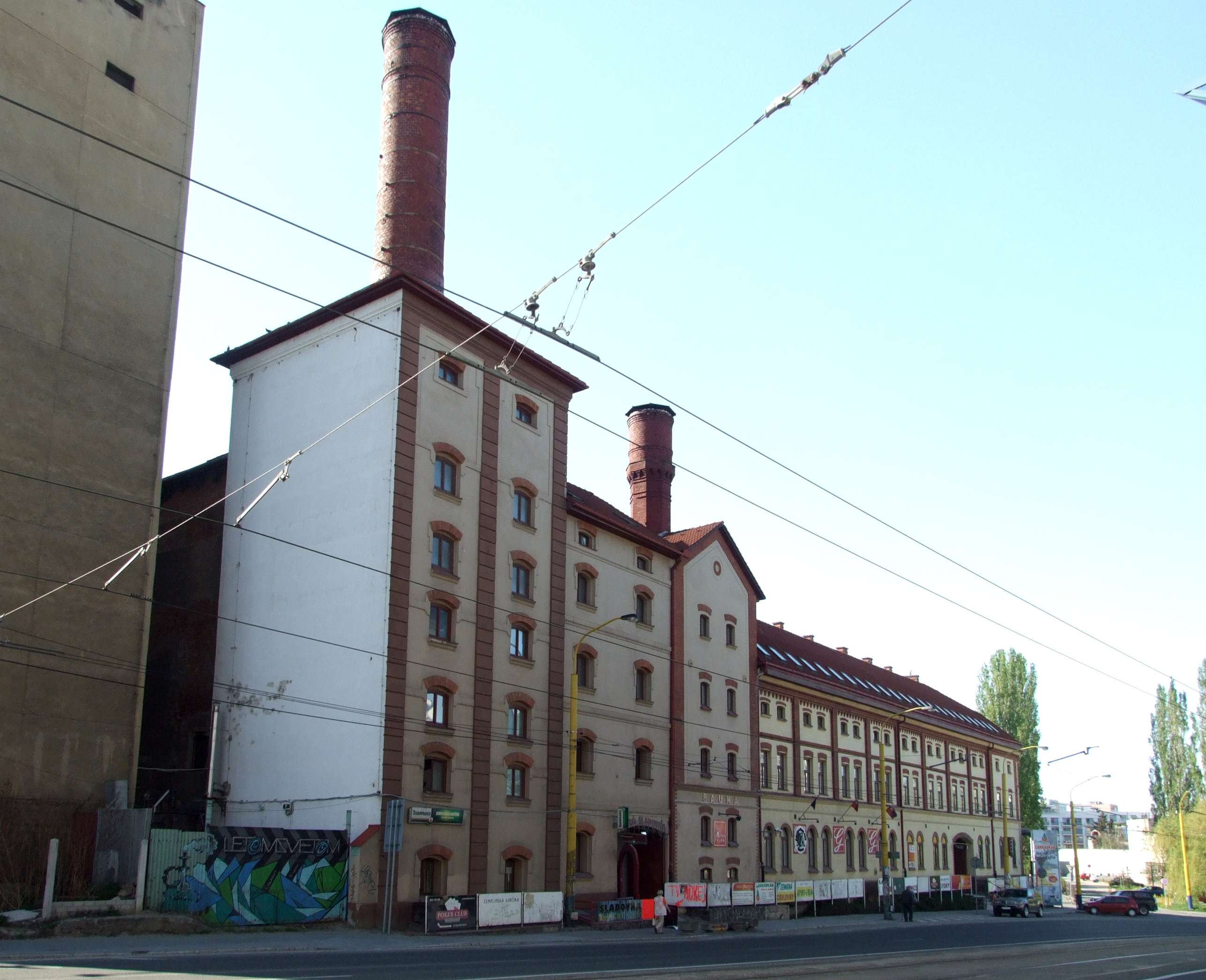
Old Brewery (Stará sladovňa) at Štúr Street

Religious buildings and cemeteries

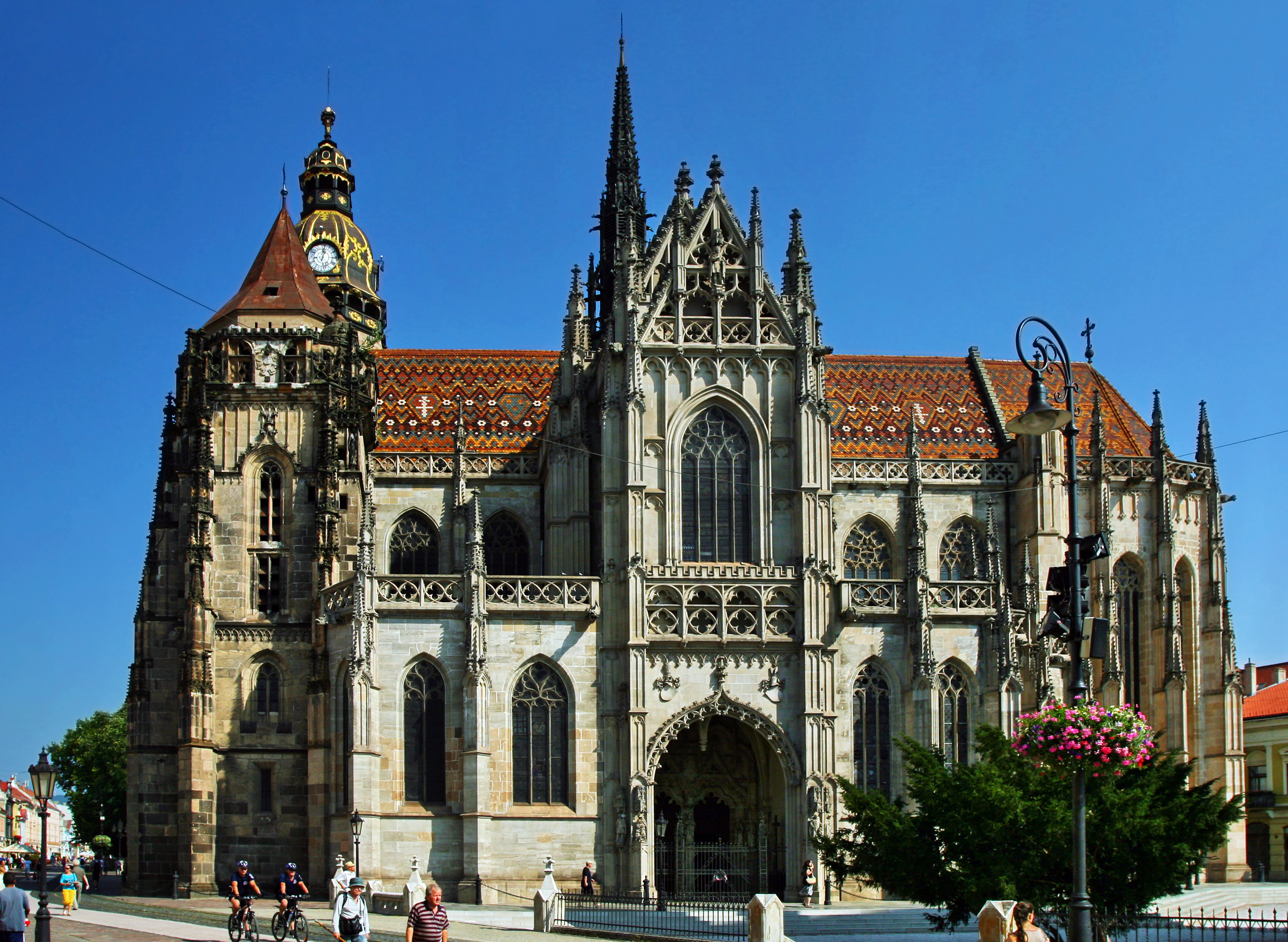
Cathedral of St Elisabeth on Main Street

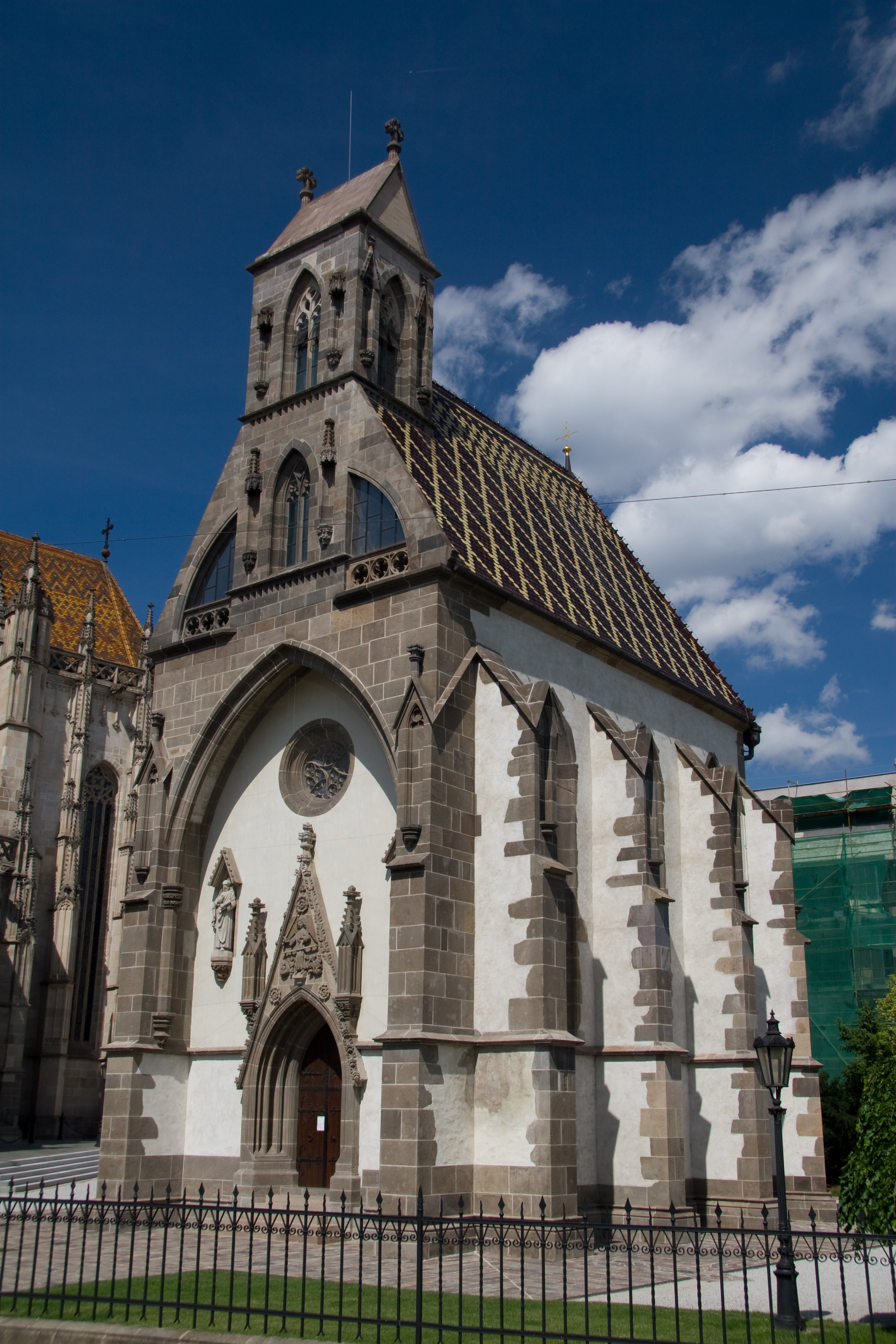
Chapel of St Michael on Main Street

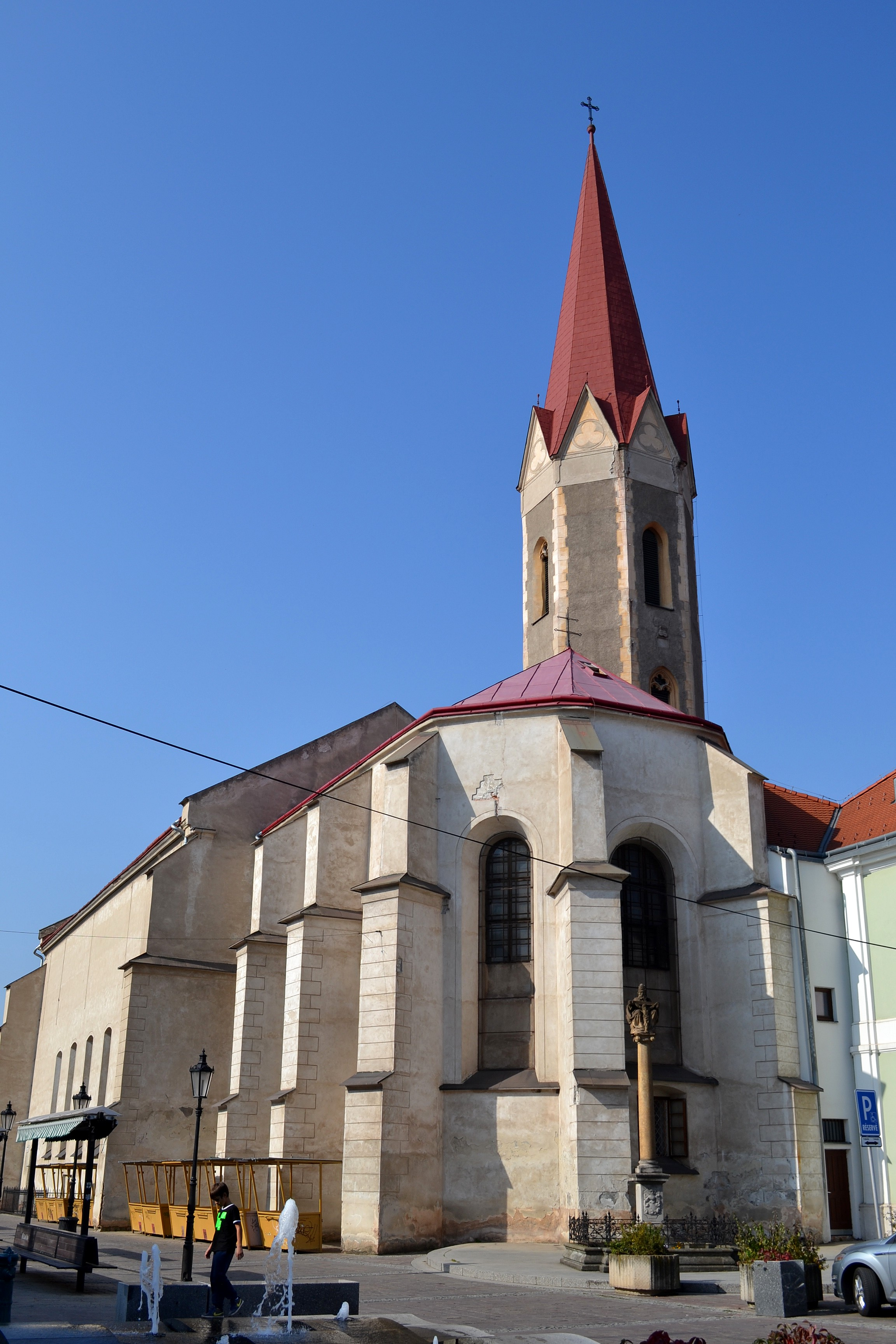
Dominican Church at the Dominican Square, the oldest surviving church

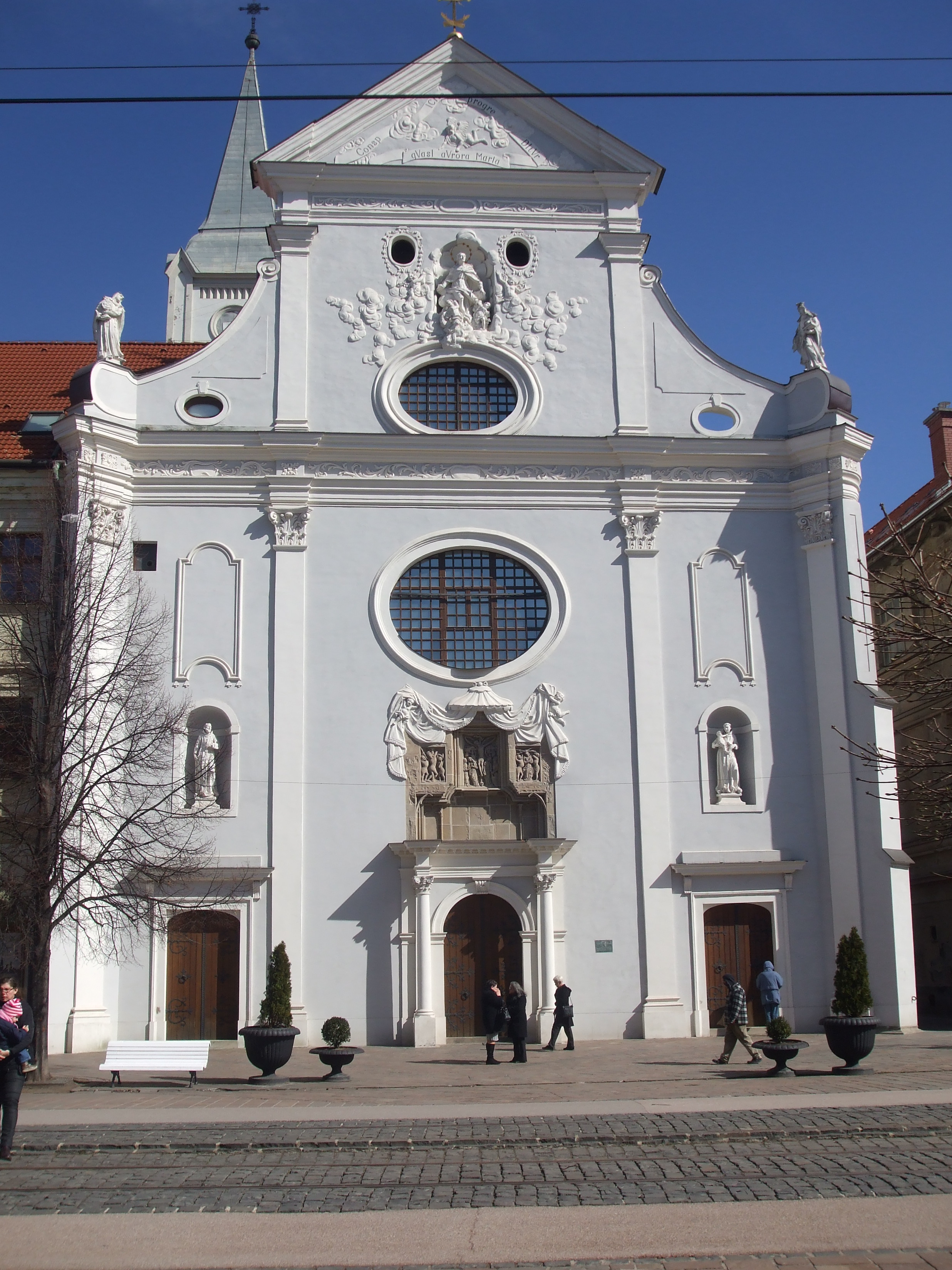
Church of Saint Anthony of Padua, Baroque front facade from Main Street

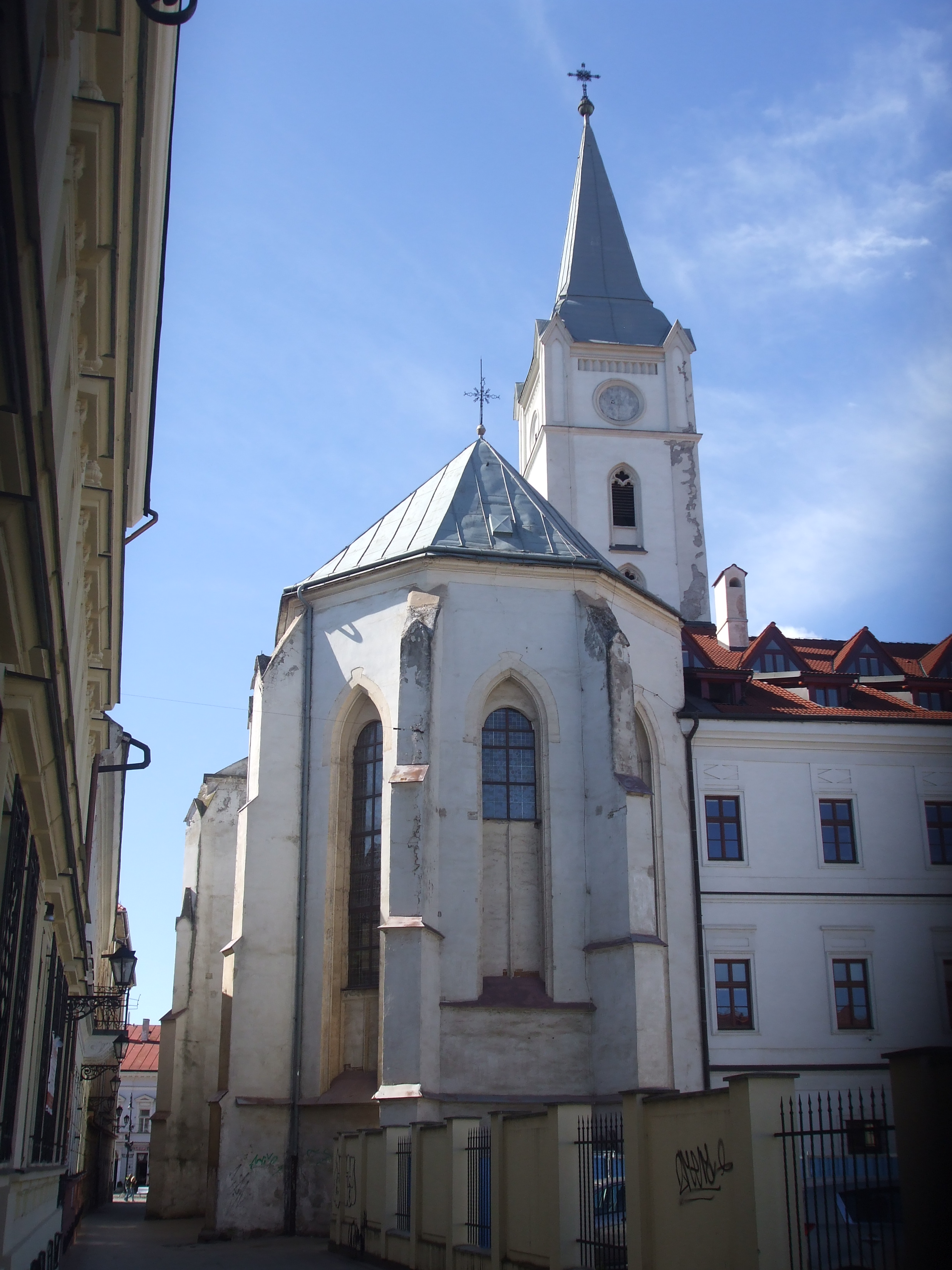
Church of Saint Anthony of Padua, Gothic back end

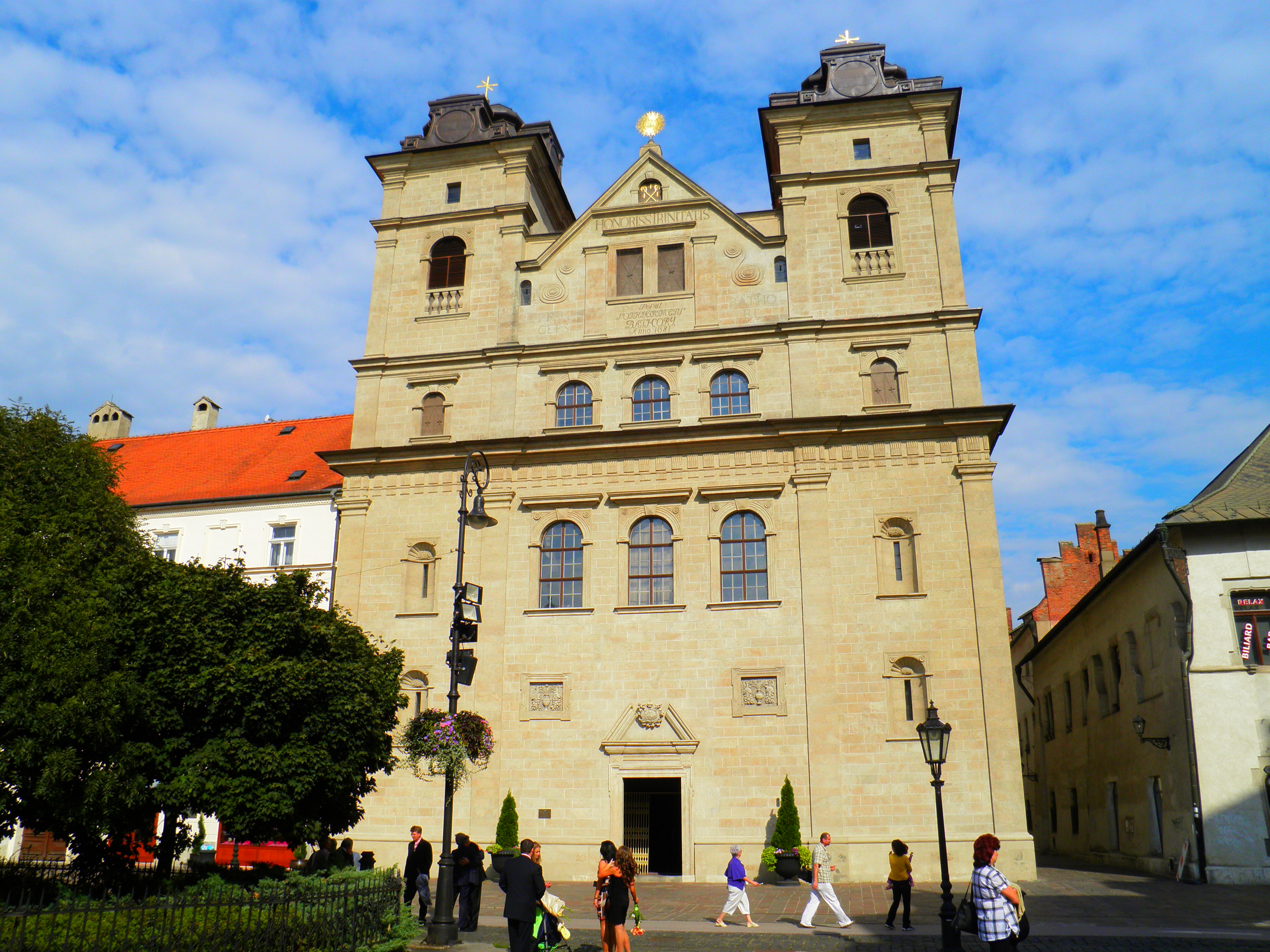
Church of the Holy Trinity on Main Street

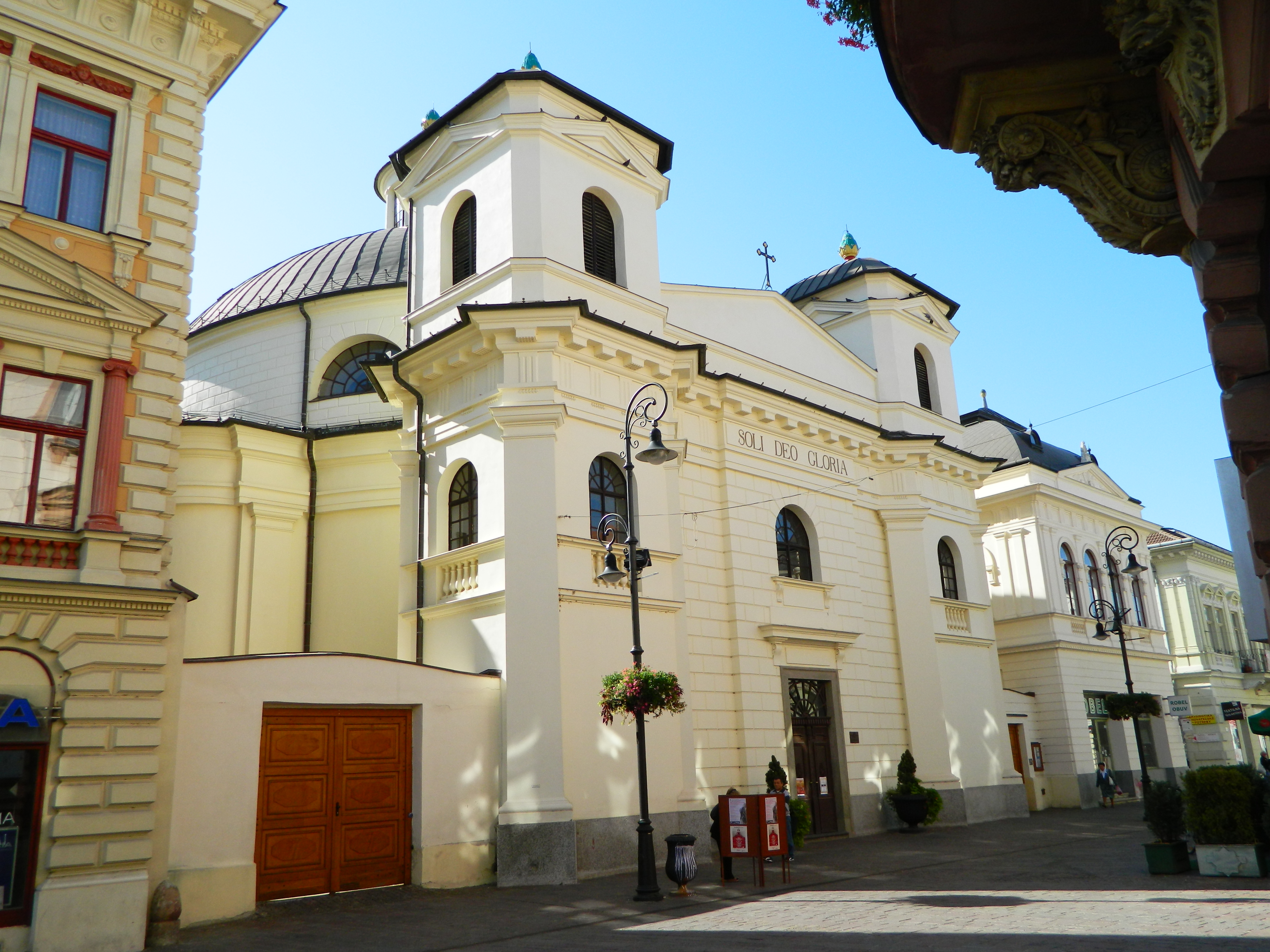
Evangelic Church on Mlynská (Mill) Street

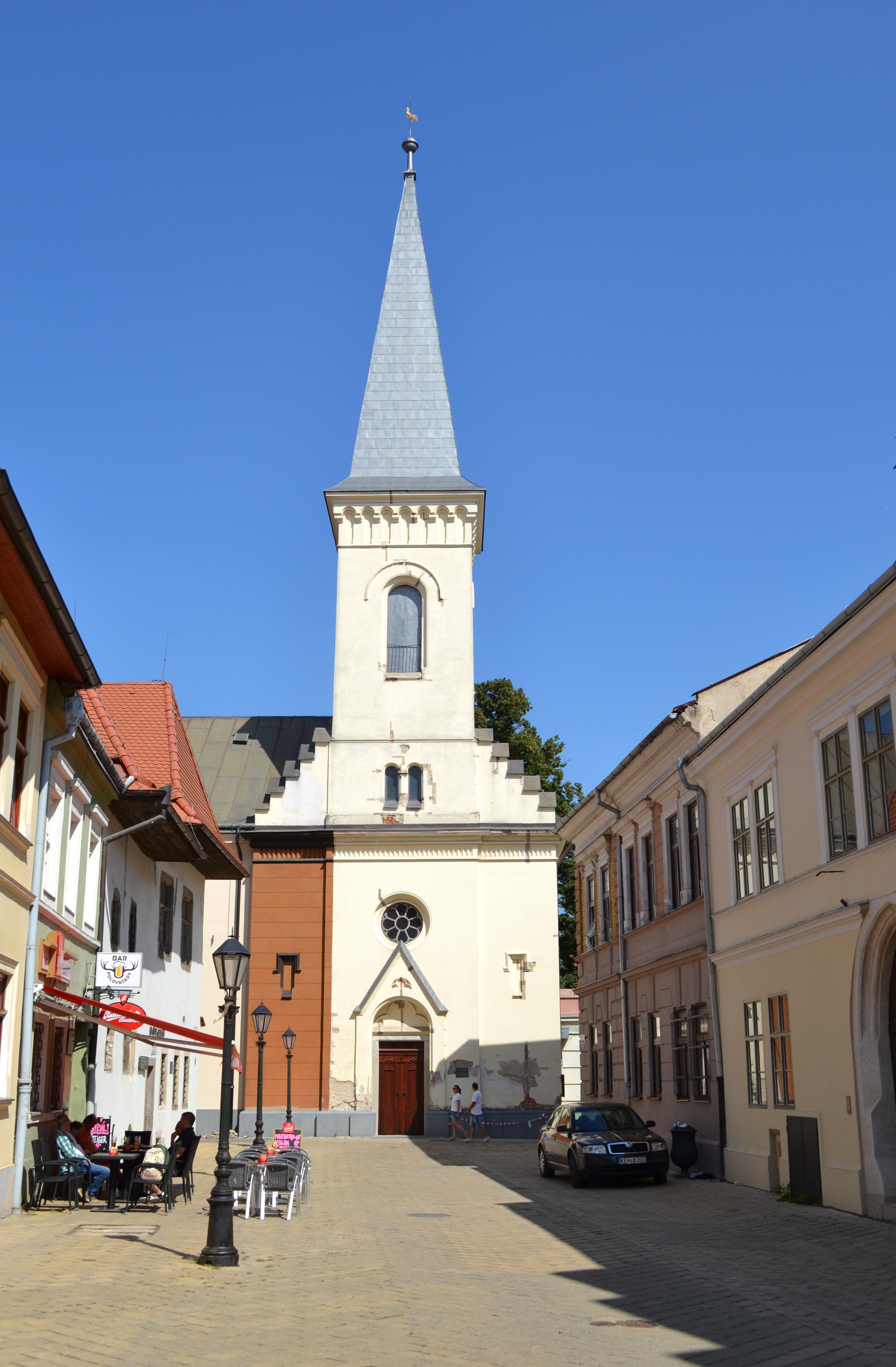
Calvinist Church at the corner of Hrnčiarska (Potter's) Street

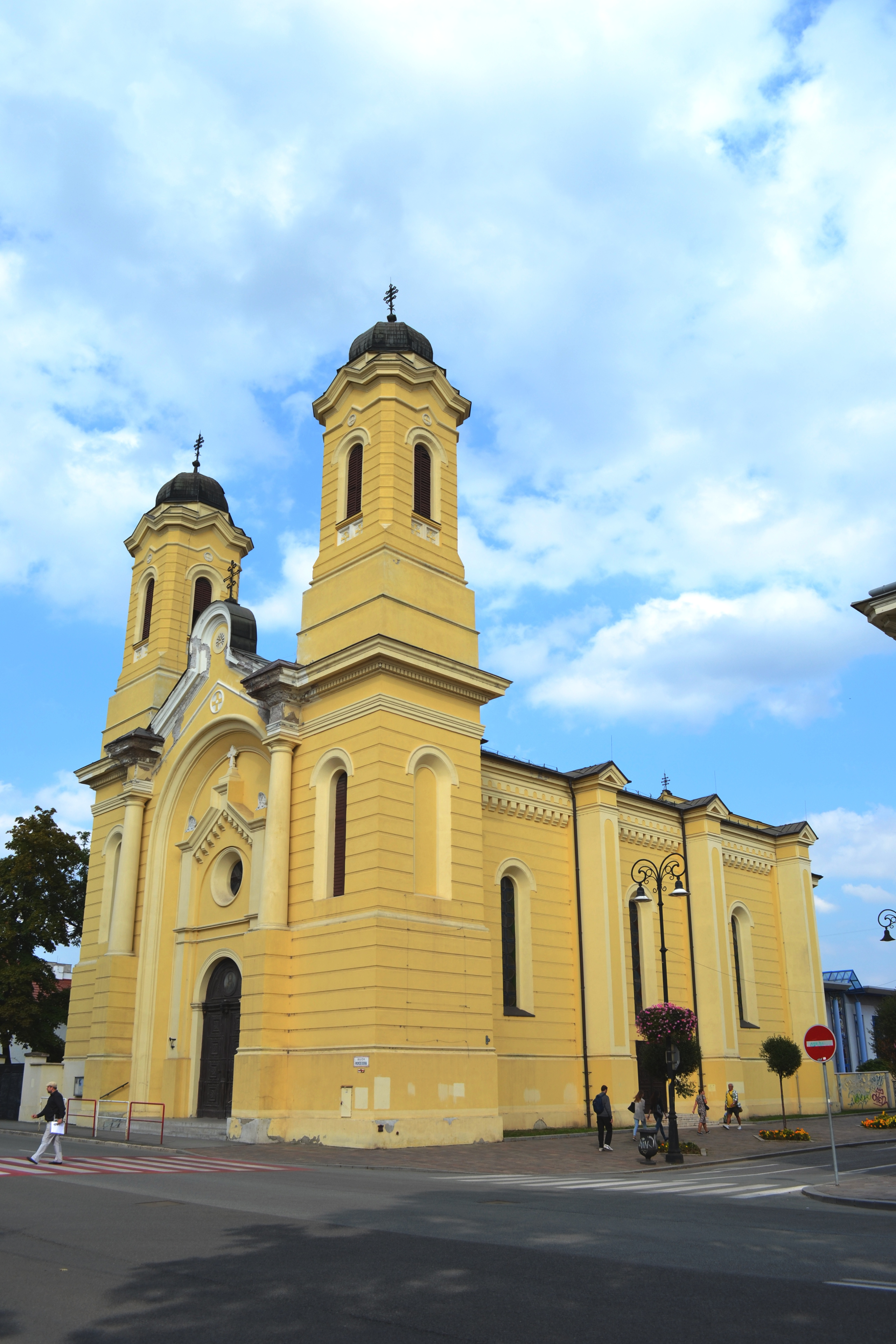
Greek Catholic Cathedral of the Nativity of the Mother of God

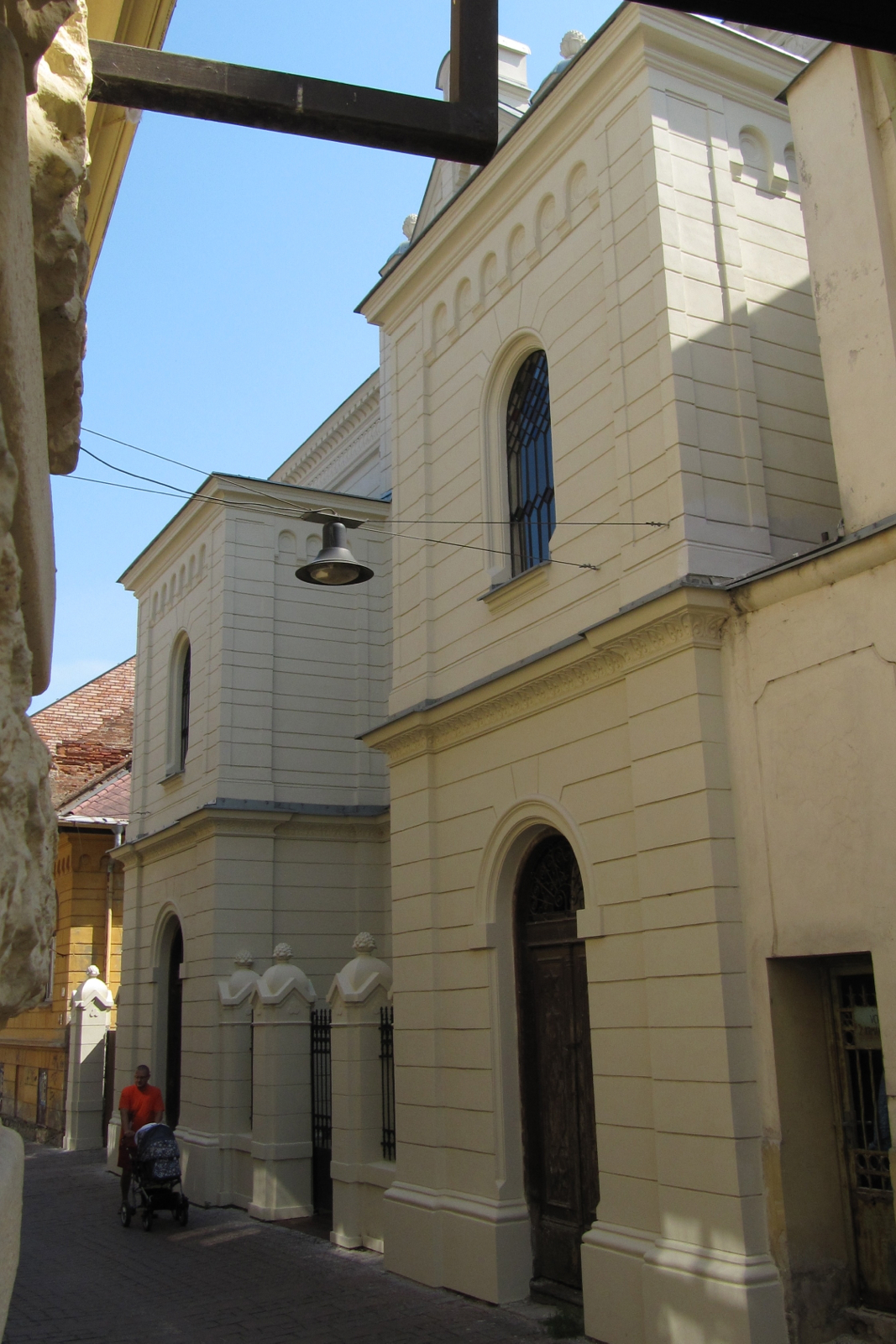
Orthodox synagogue on Zvonárska Street

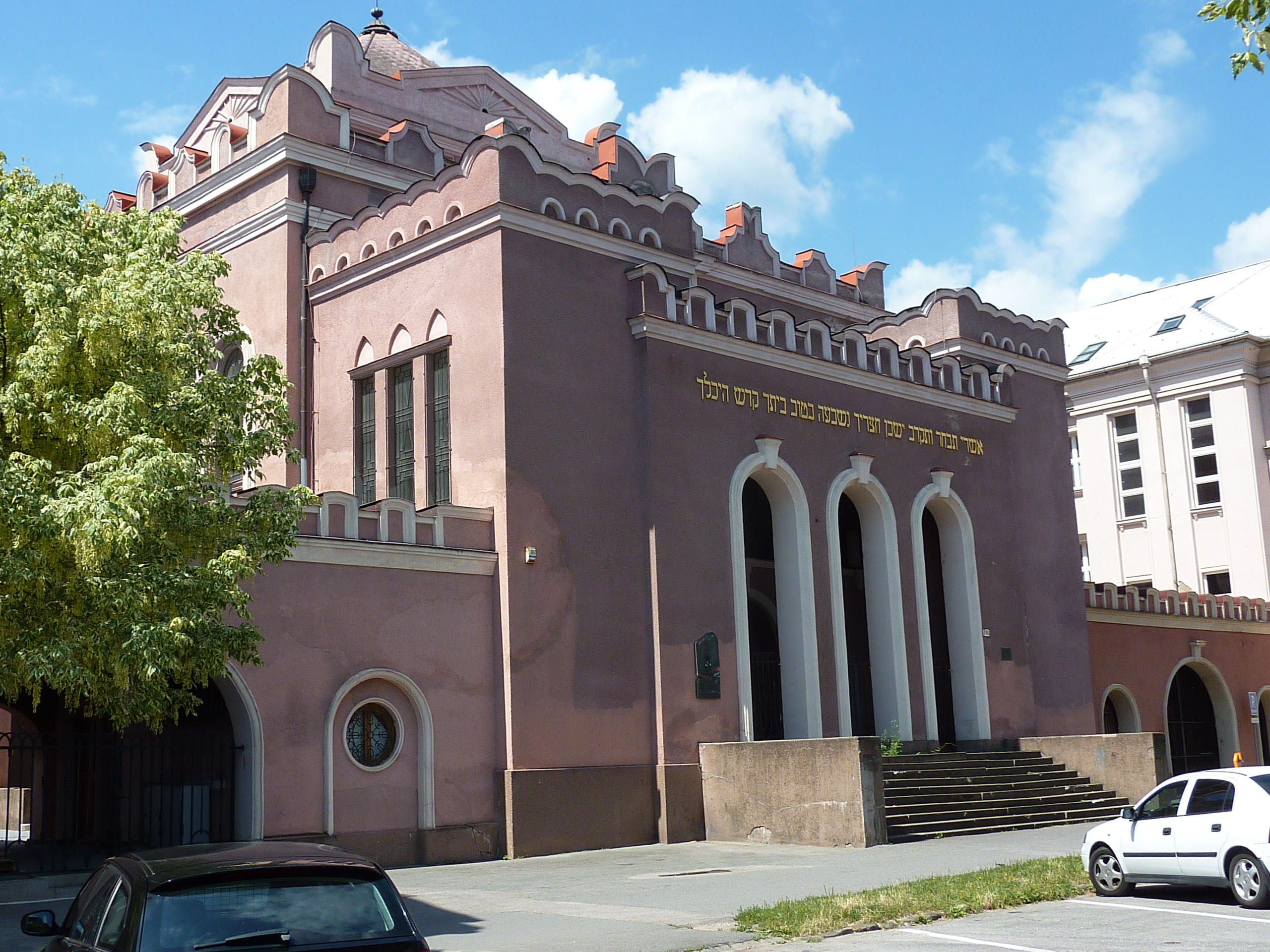
New Orthodox synagogue on Puškinova Street

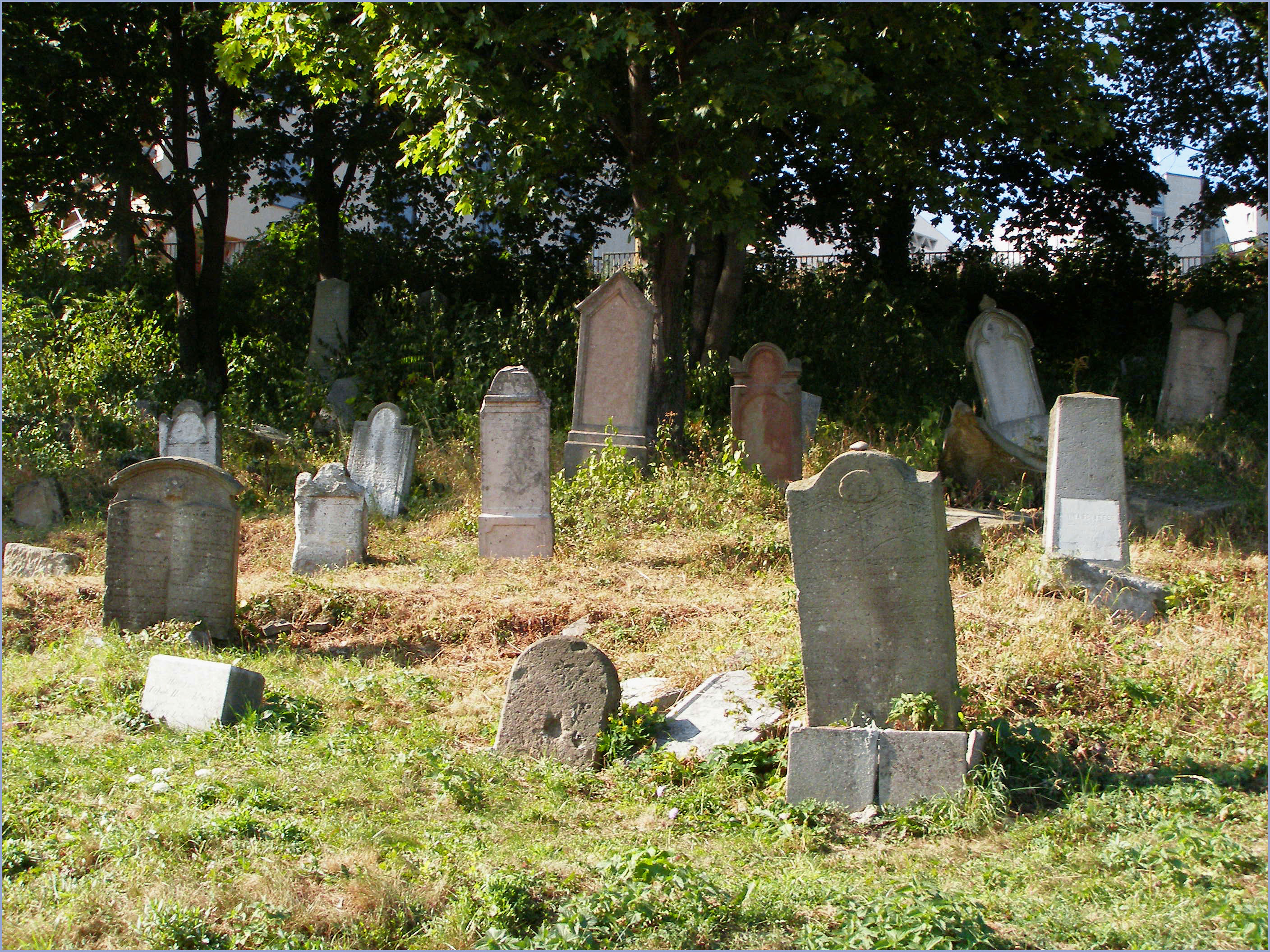
Old Jewish Cemetery (19th century, Nová Terasa)

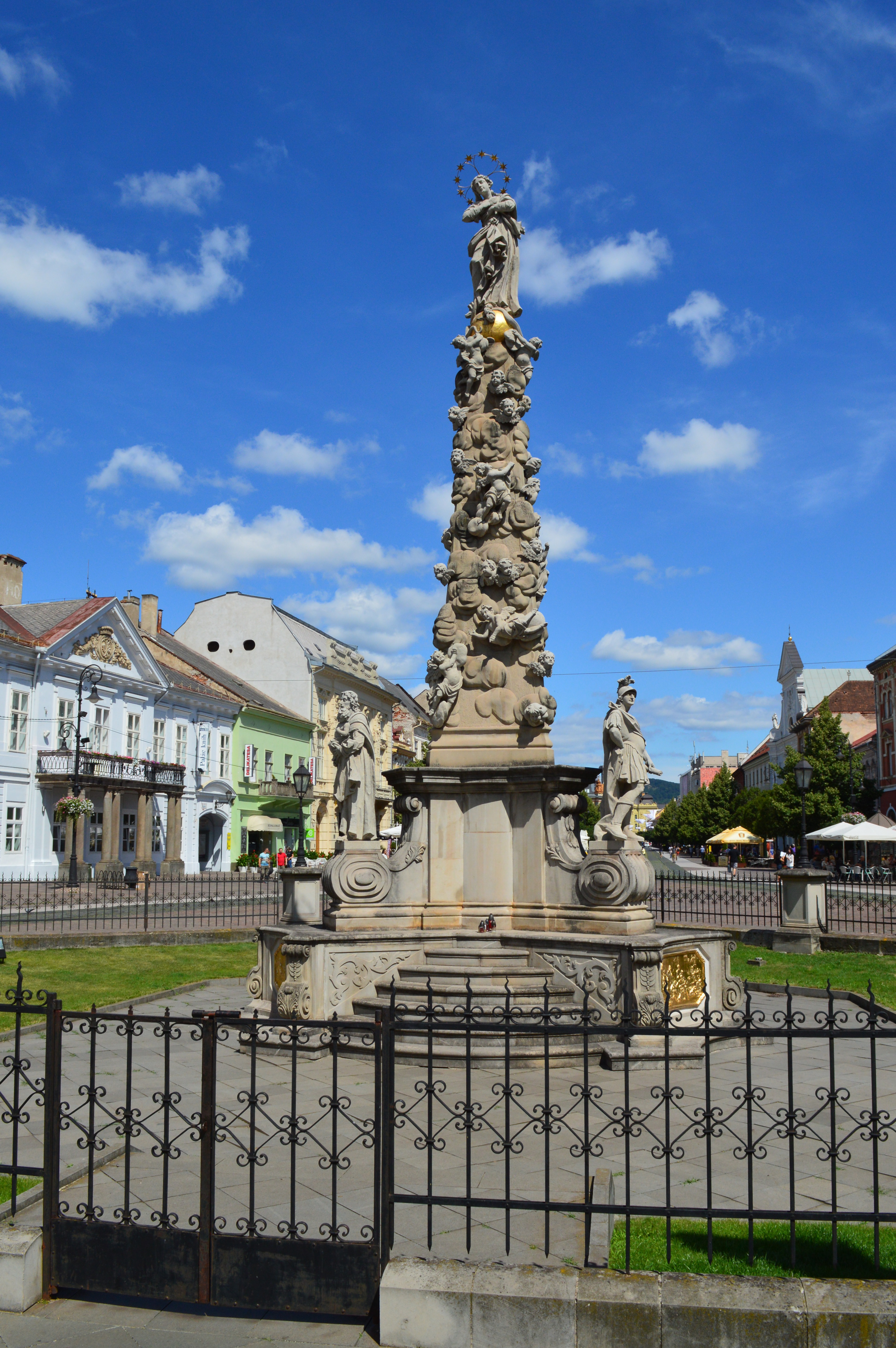
Marian Column on Main Street

Museums and art galleries

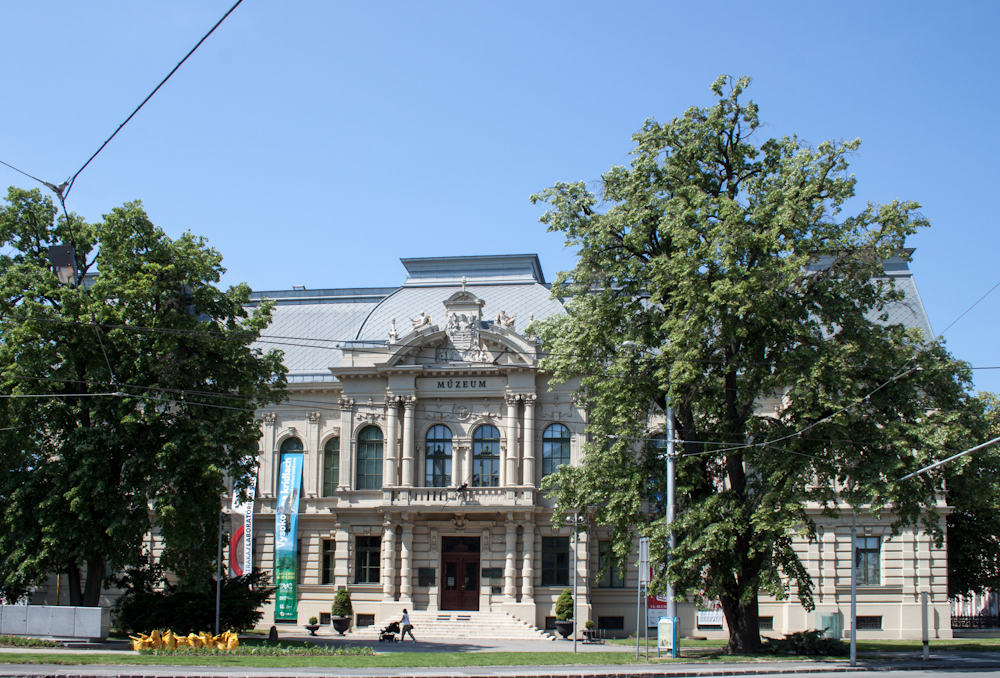
East Slovak Museum main exhibition (Marathon Runners' Square)

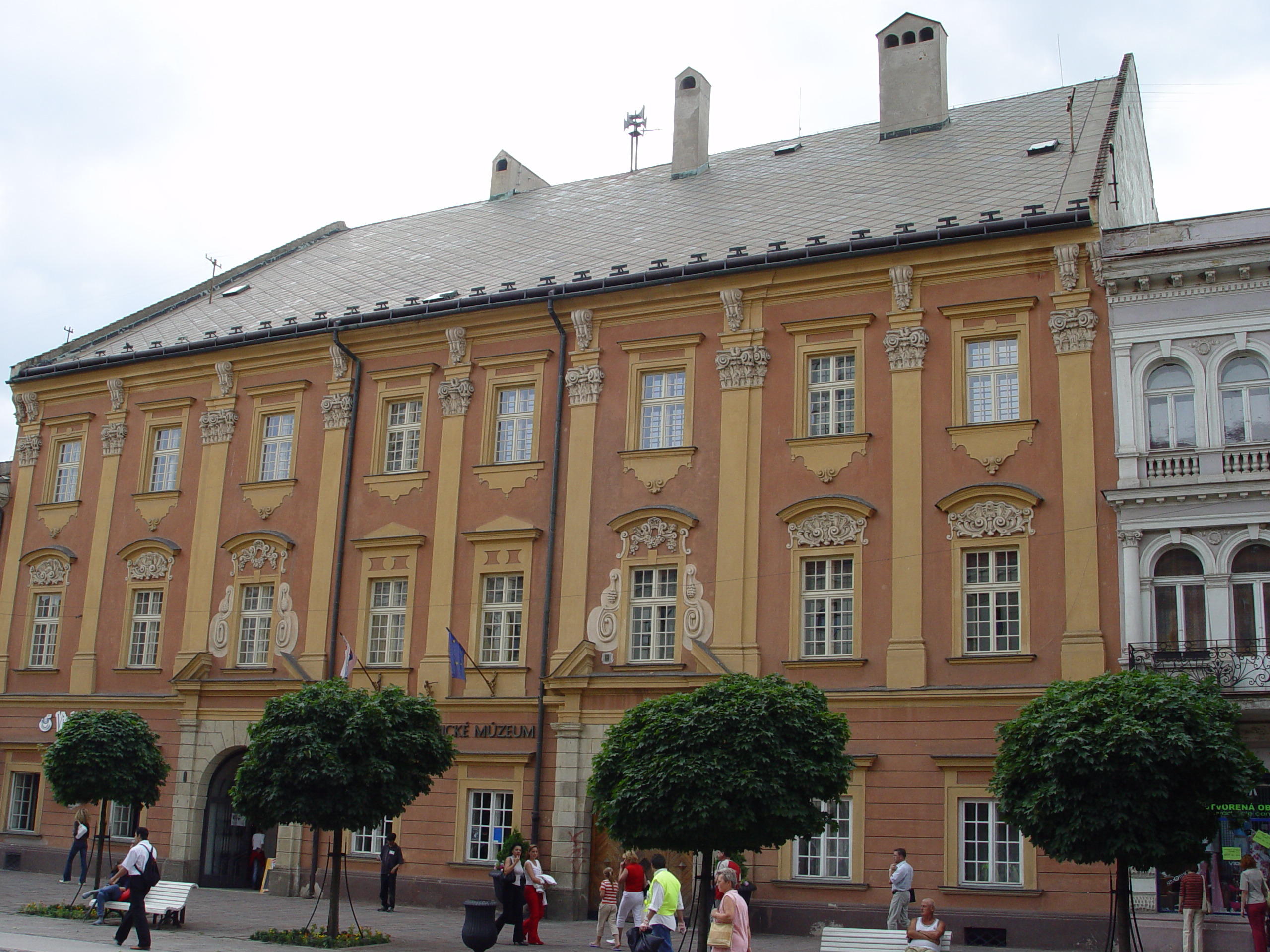
Slovak Technical Museum main exhibition (Captain Palace, Main Street)

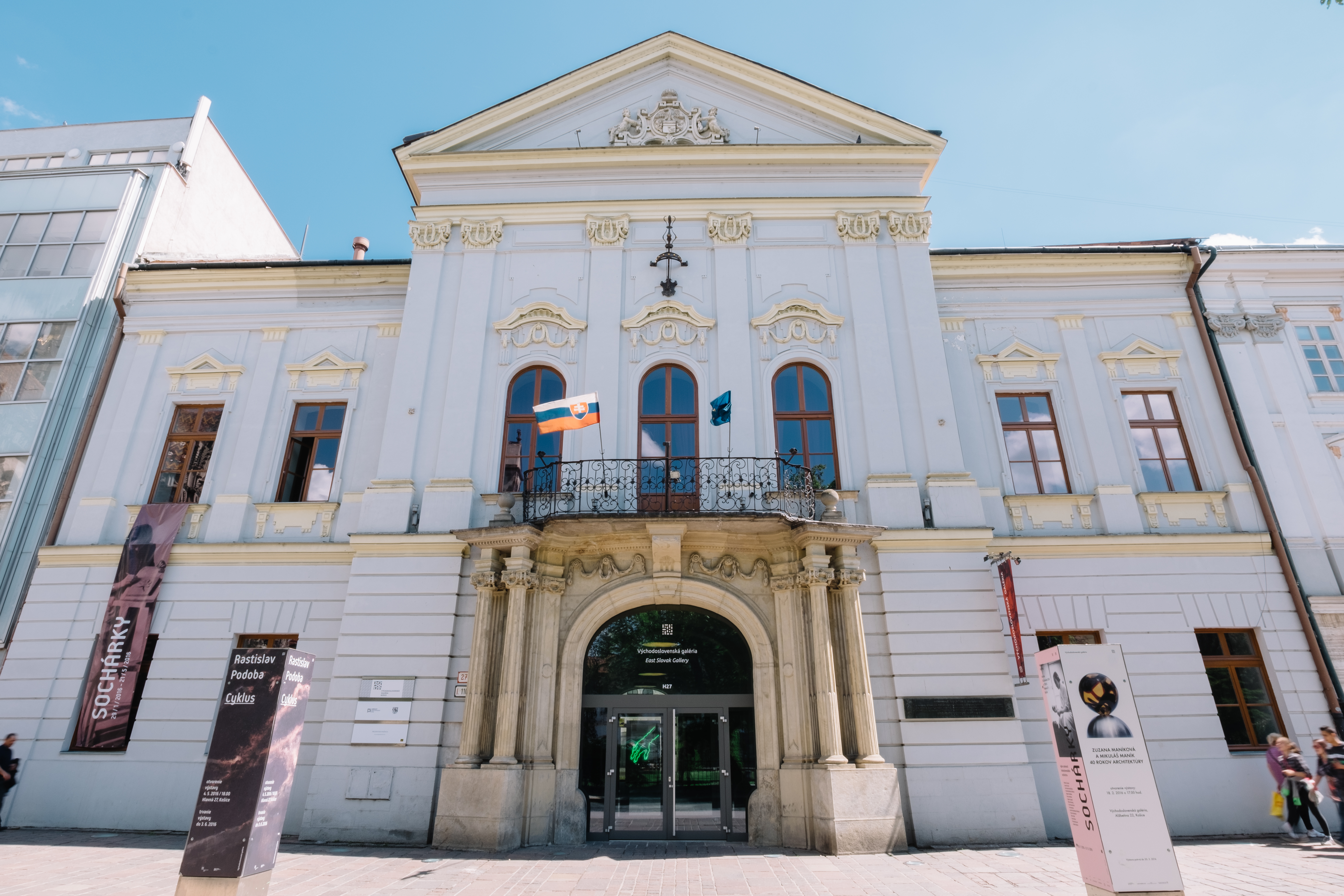
East Slovak Gallery (Main Street)

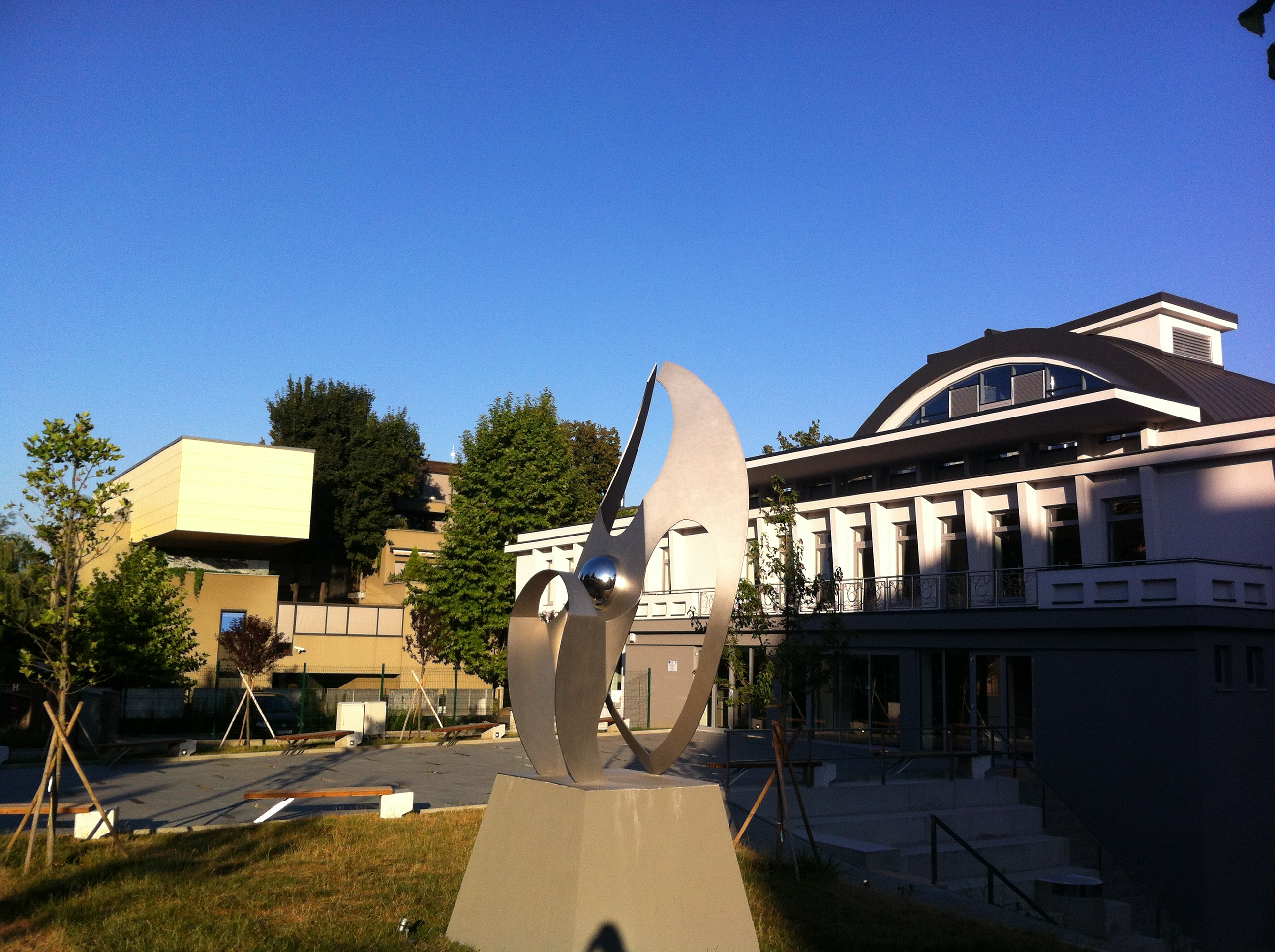
Kunsthalle Košice

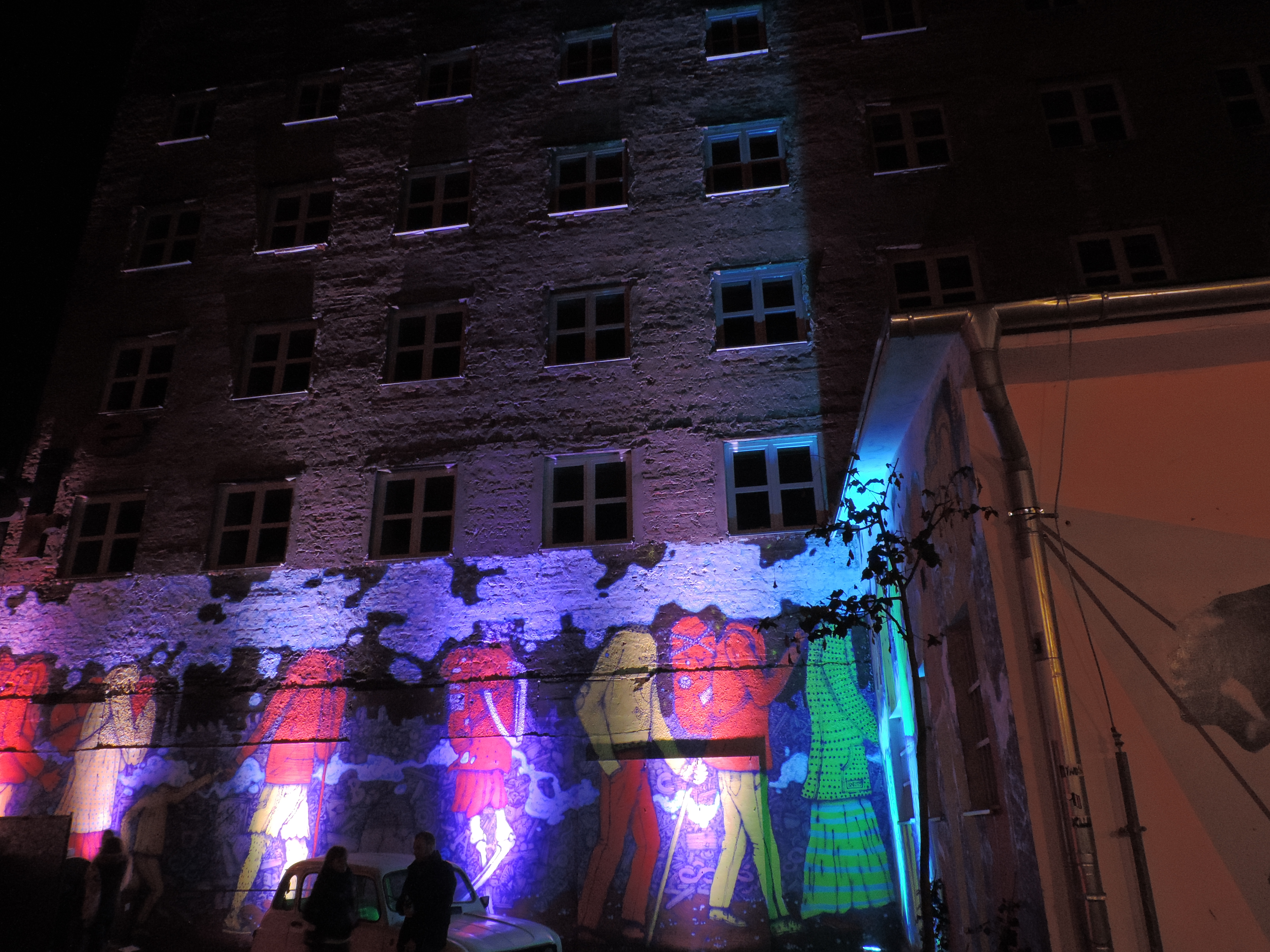
Tabačka Kulturfabrik

Historical fortifications

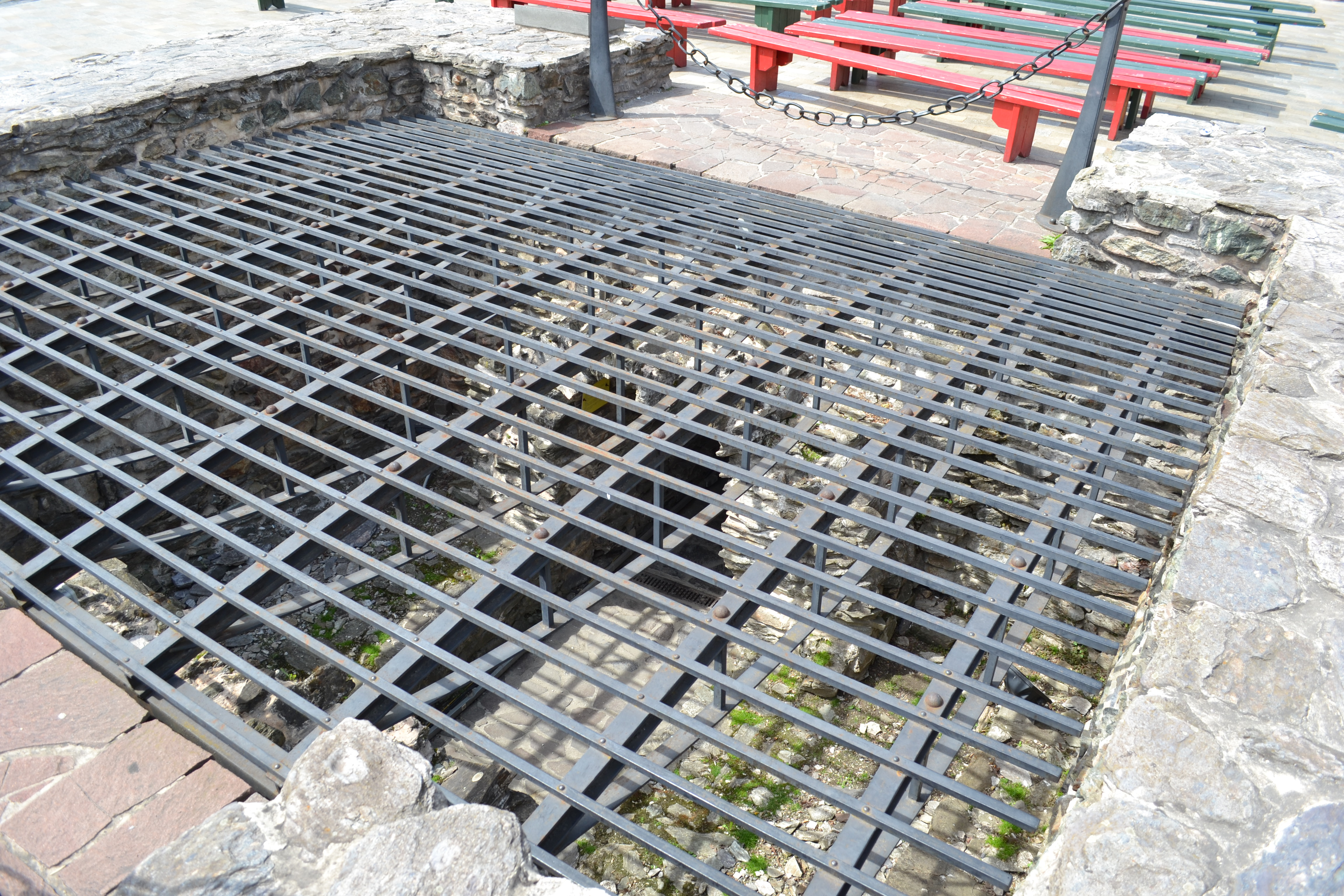
Archaeological exhibition of Dolná brána (Lower Gate) fortifications and city sewers at the southern end of Main Street

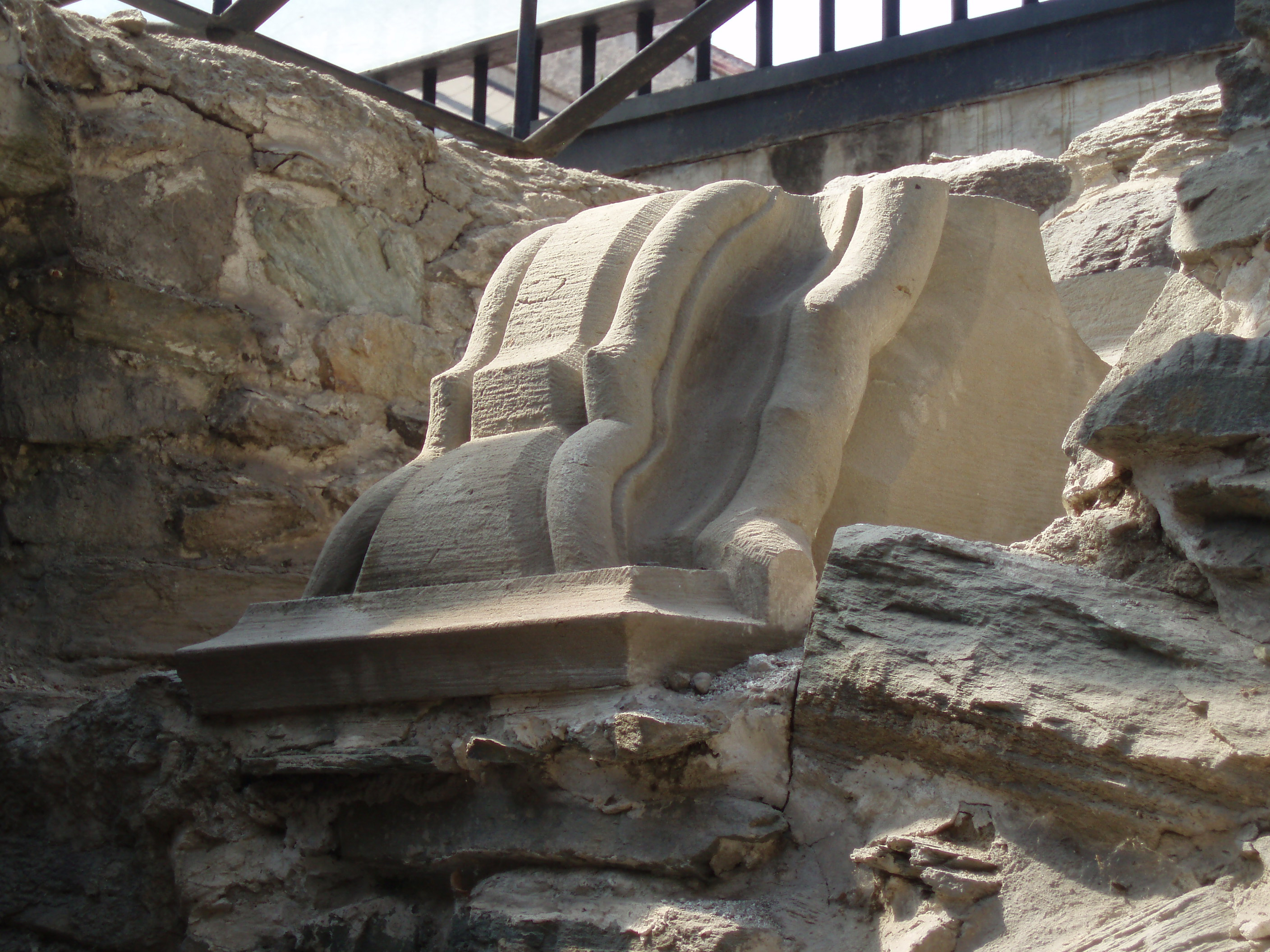
Fragment of the medieval wall system in Košice, at the Luxembourg Tower location

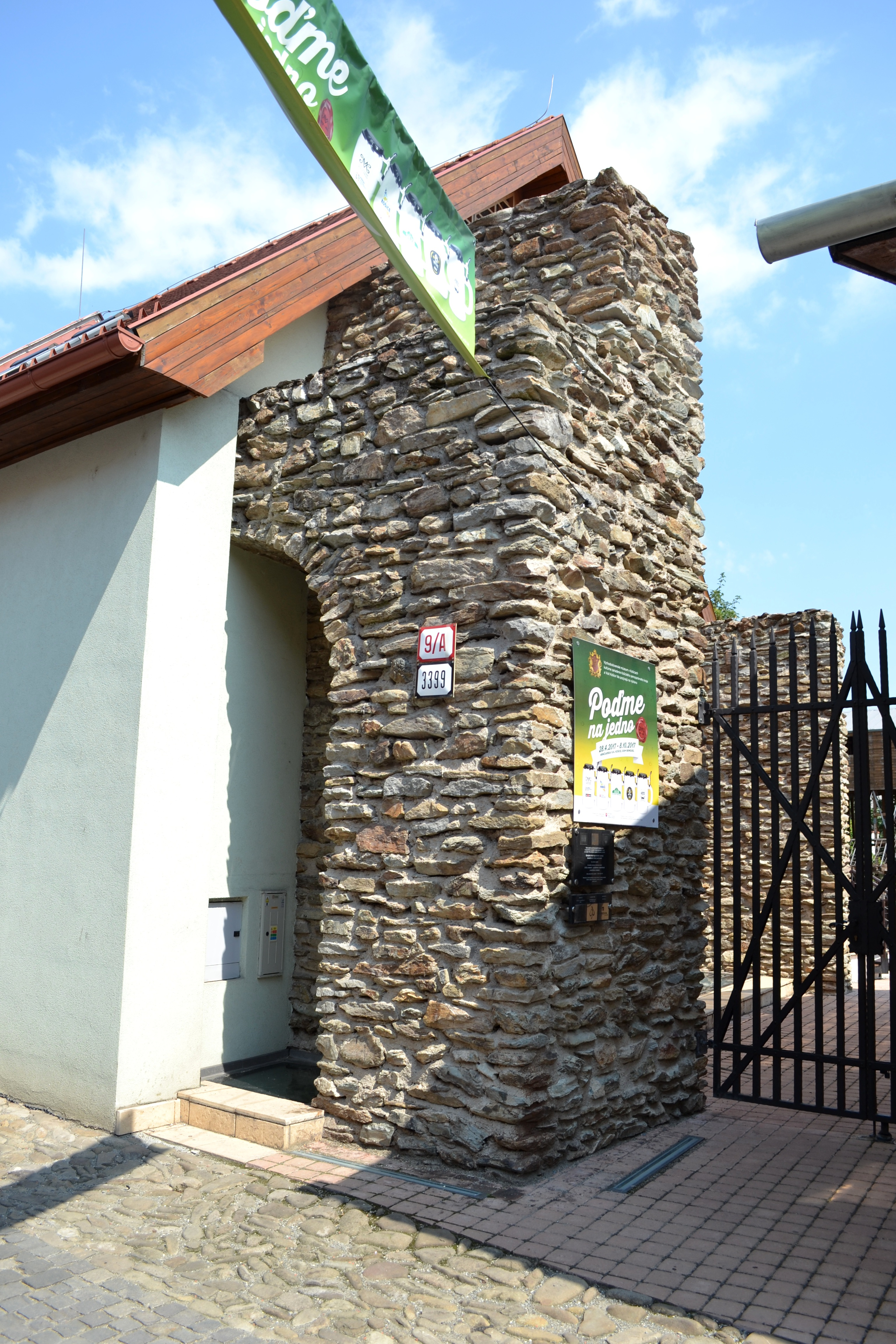
Remnants of city walls at Hrnčiarska Street

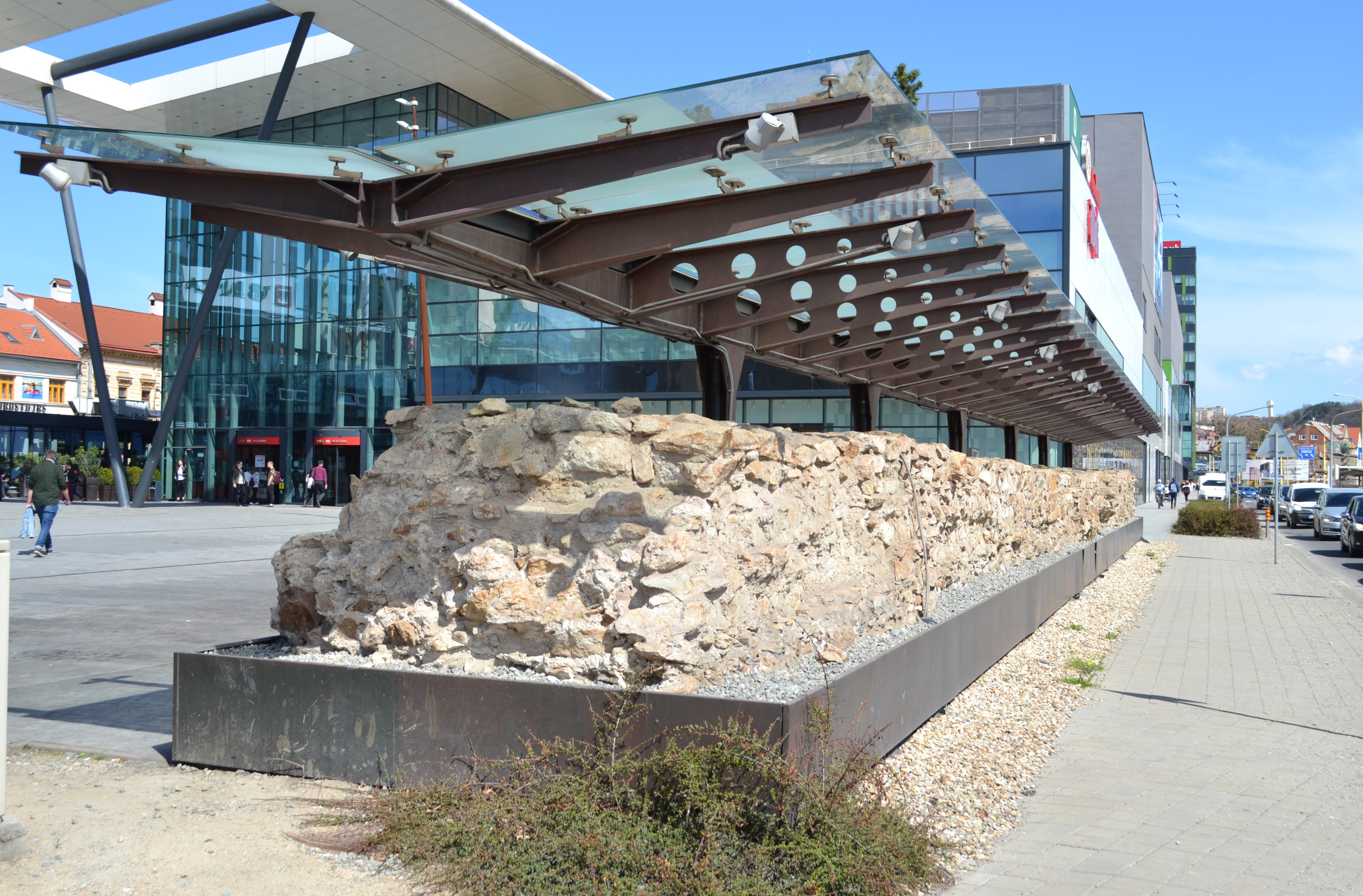
Rediscovered part of city walls at Námestie osloboditeľov (Liberators' Square)

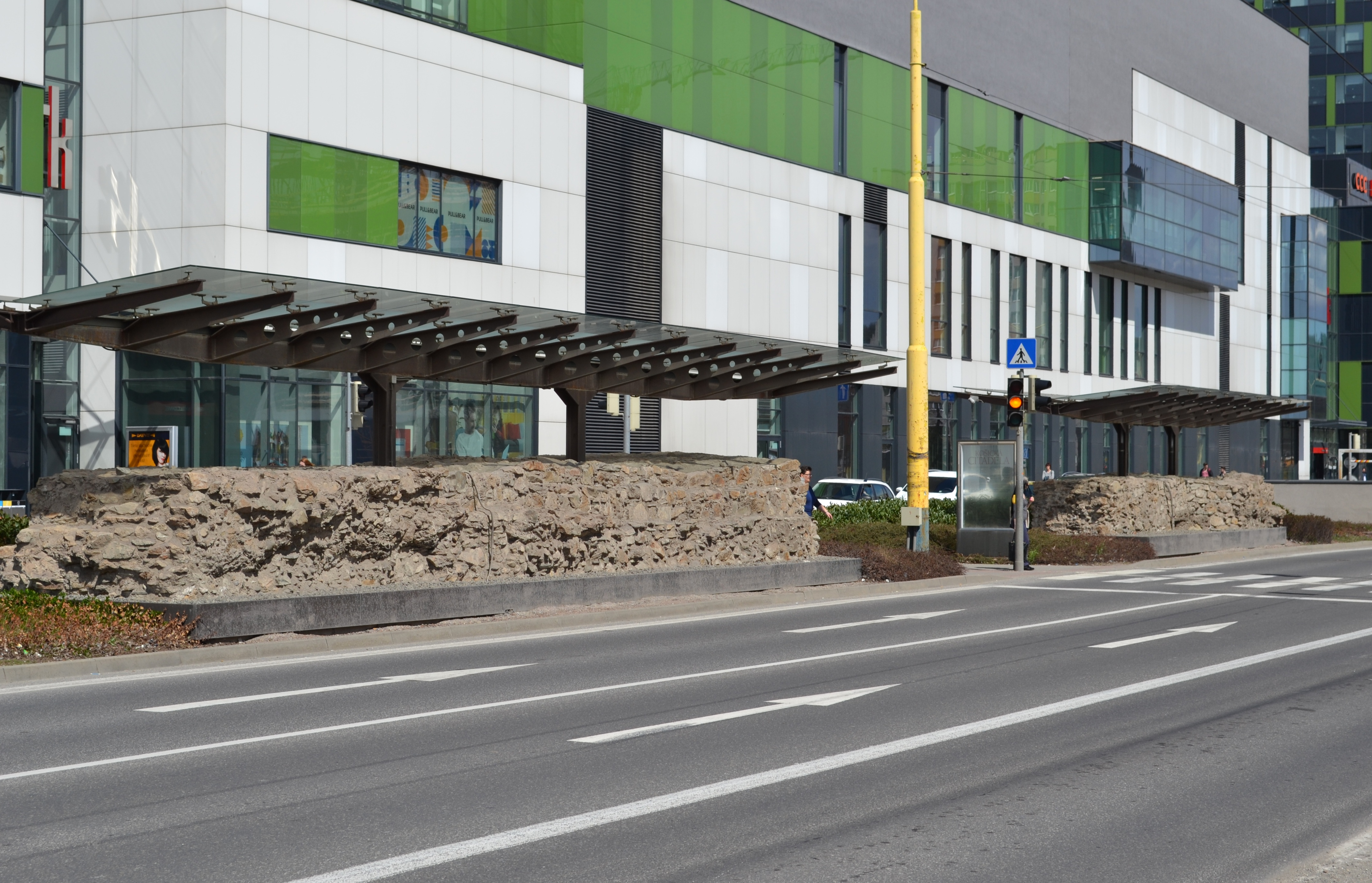
Rediscovered parts of city walls at Námestie osloboditeľov (Liberators' Square)

Newer buildings

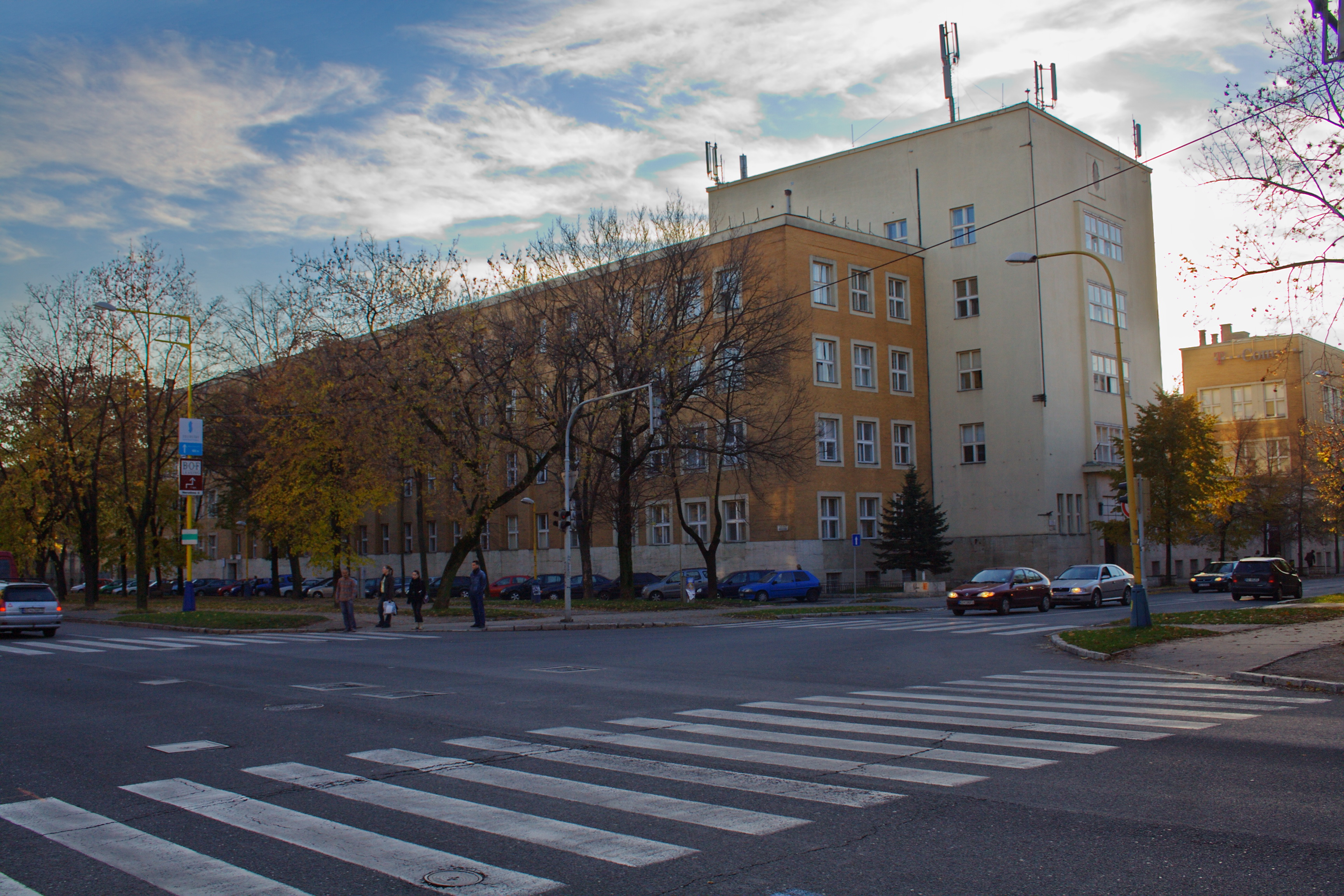
Main post office building

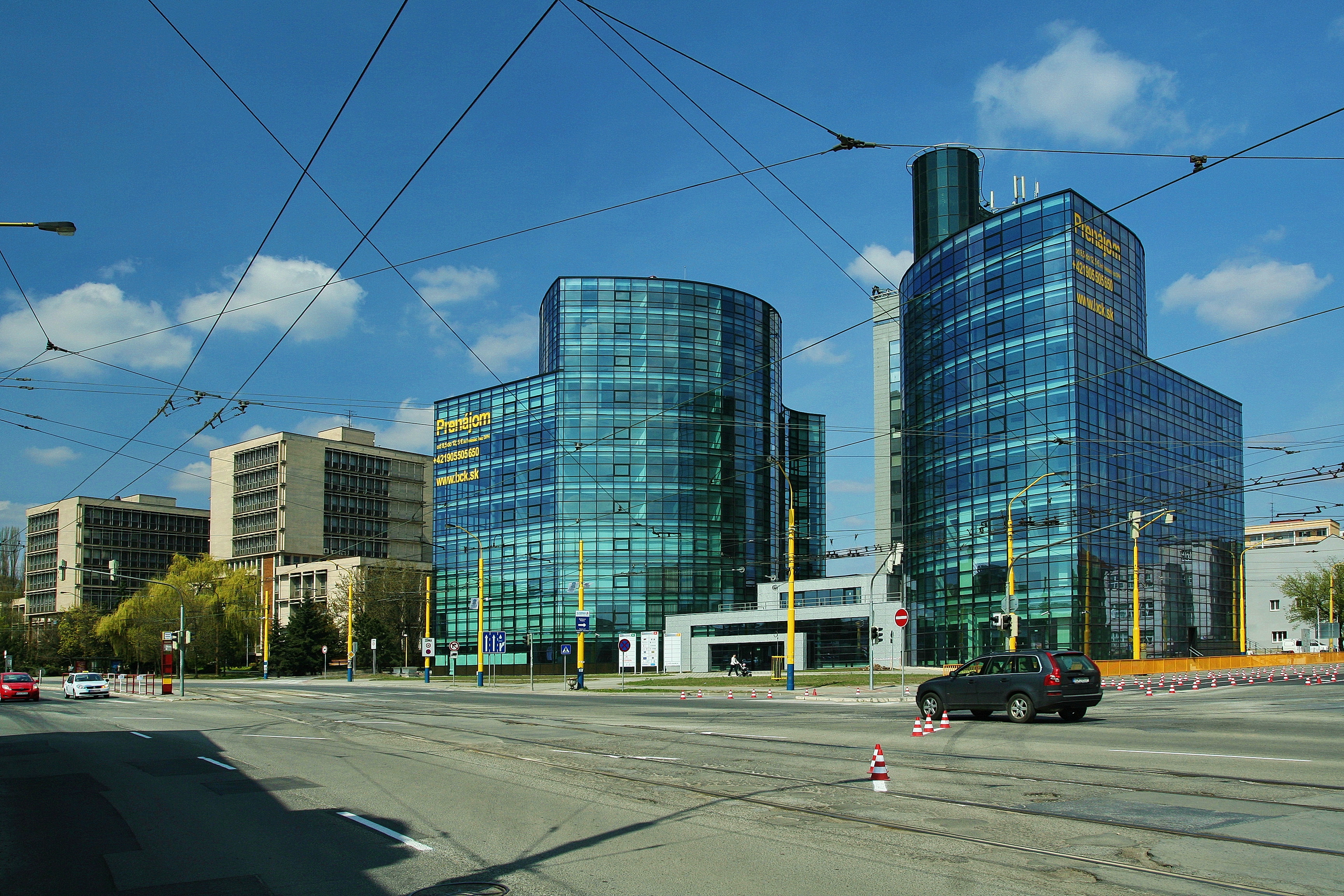
Business Centre Košice

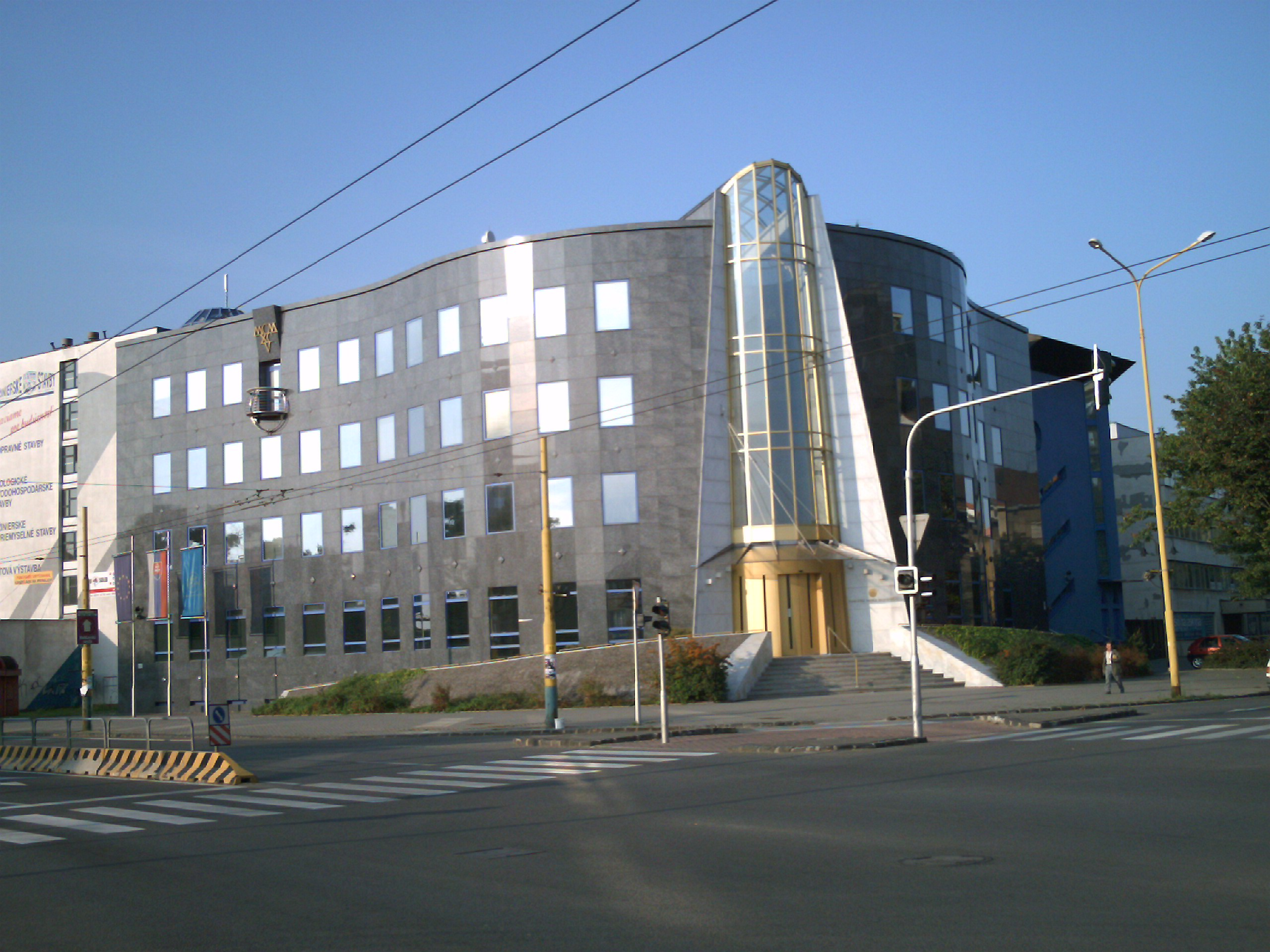
National bank of Slovakia building

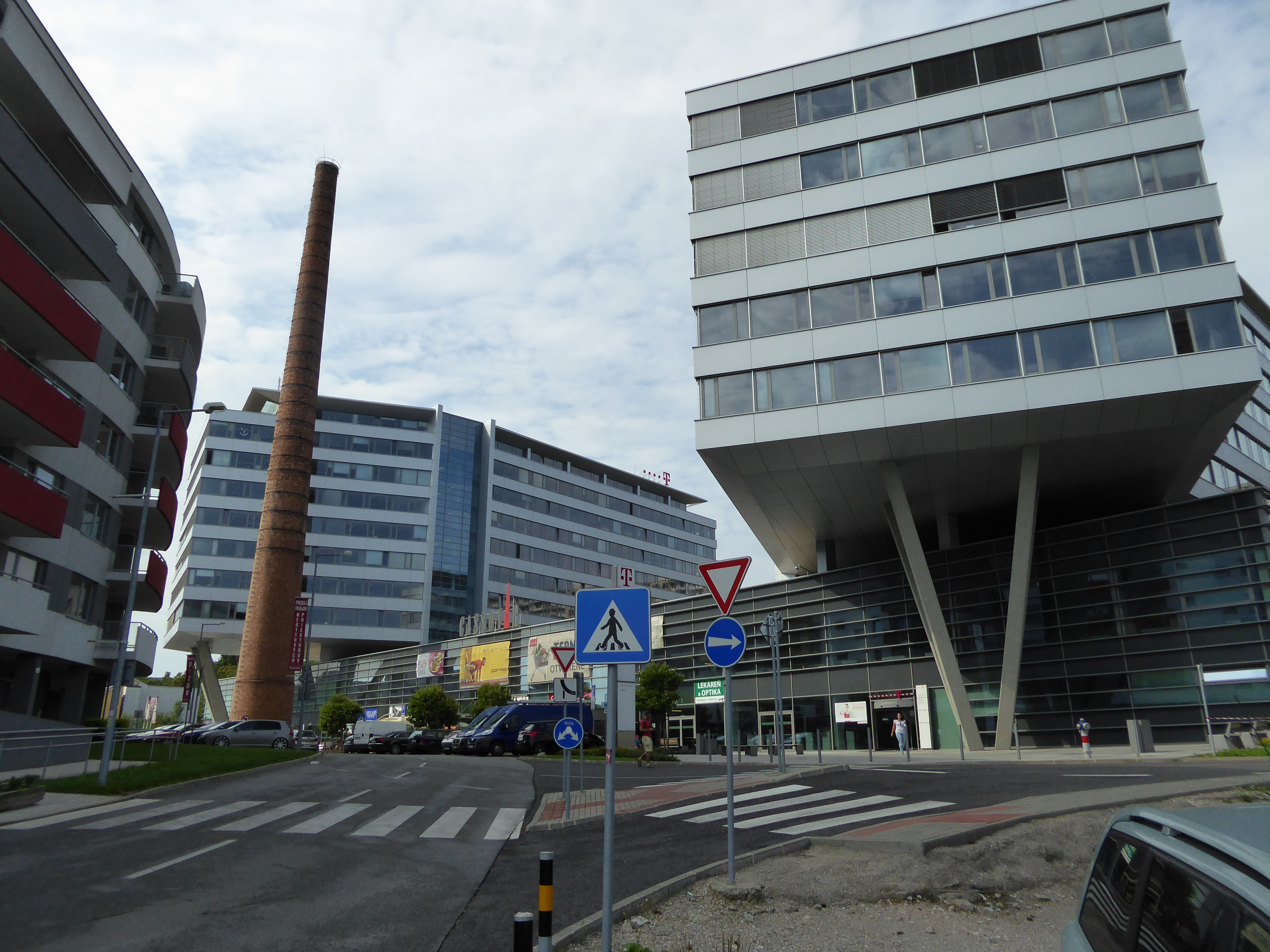

Train station

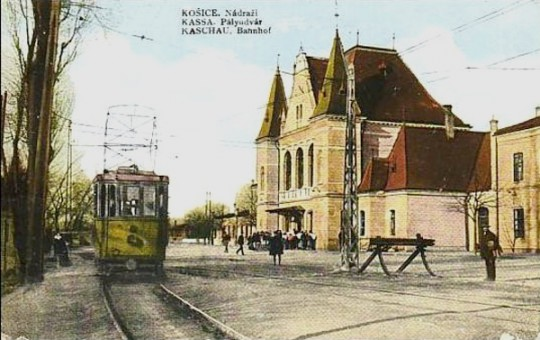
Postcard of the old train station

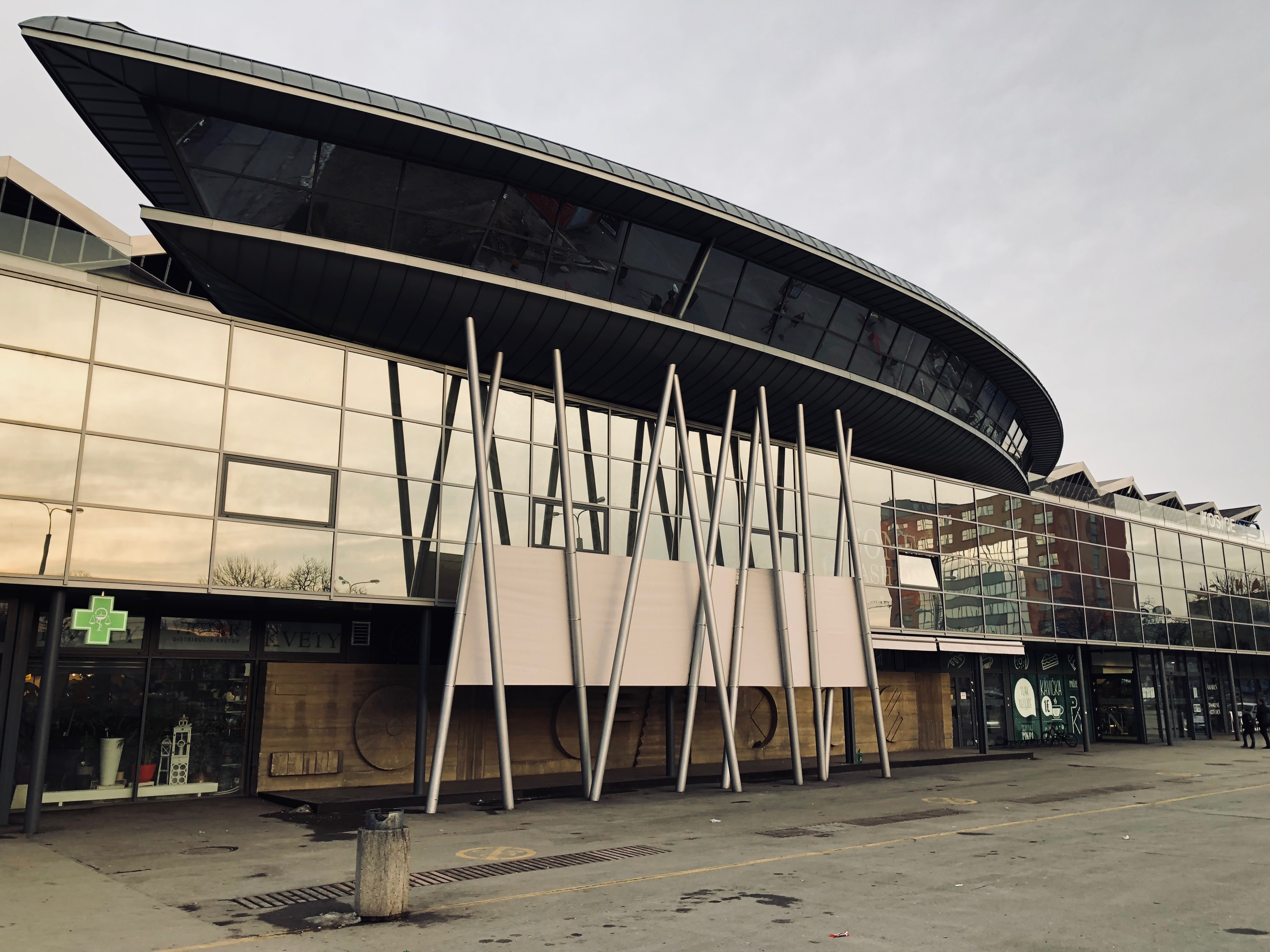
Main facade and entrance of the current train station

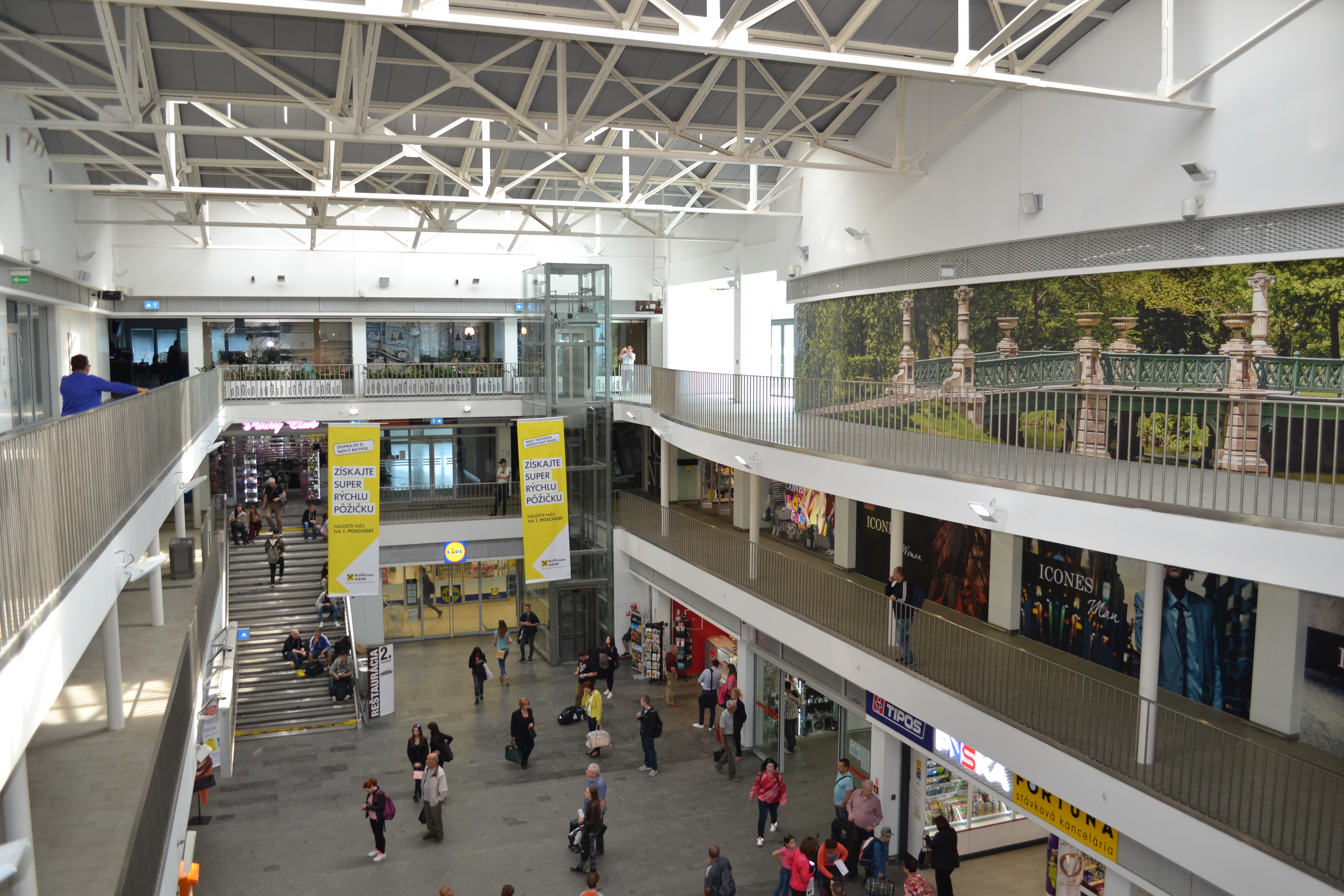
Central hall of the current train station

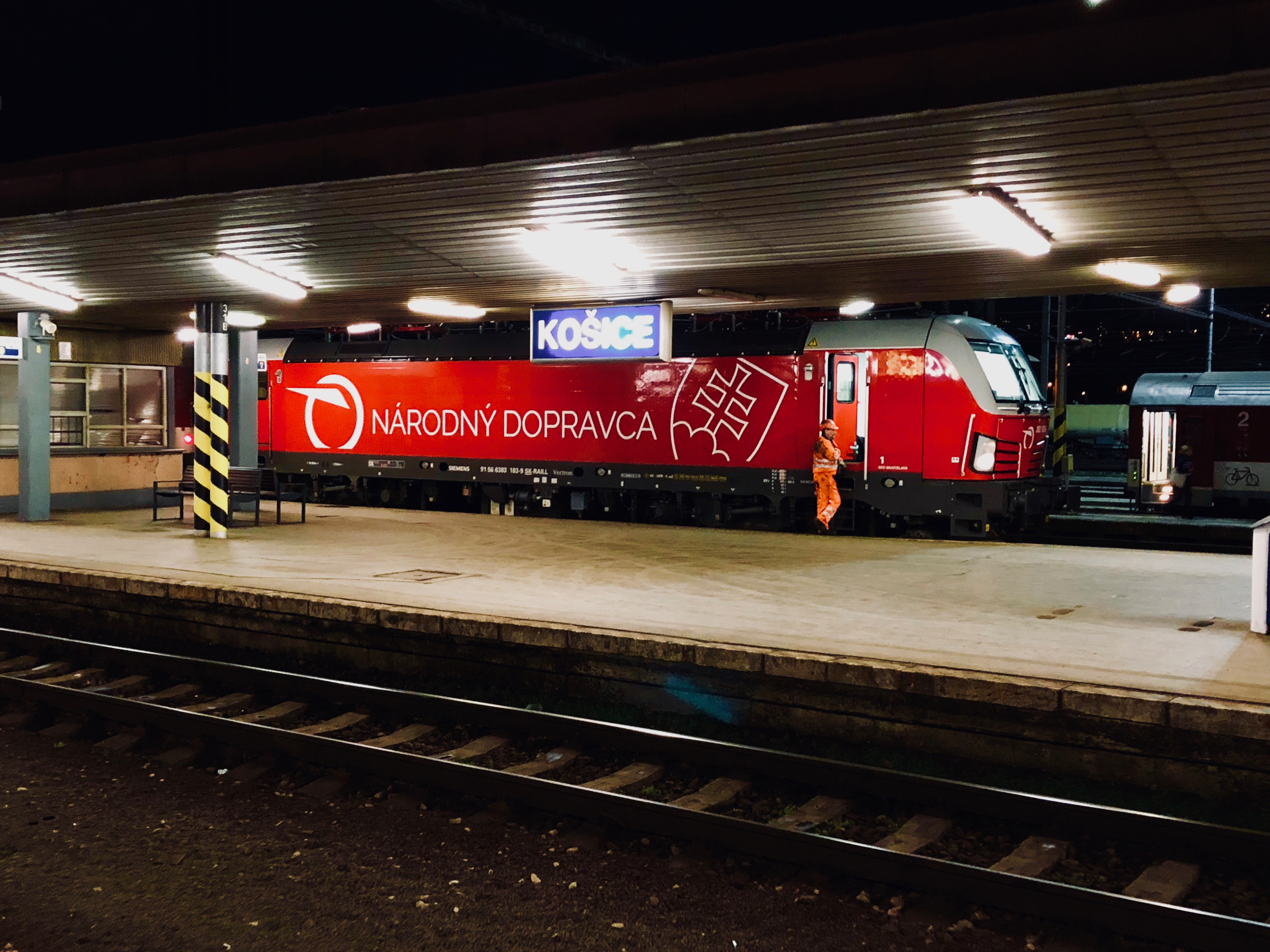
A locomotive at one of the station platforms

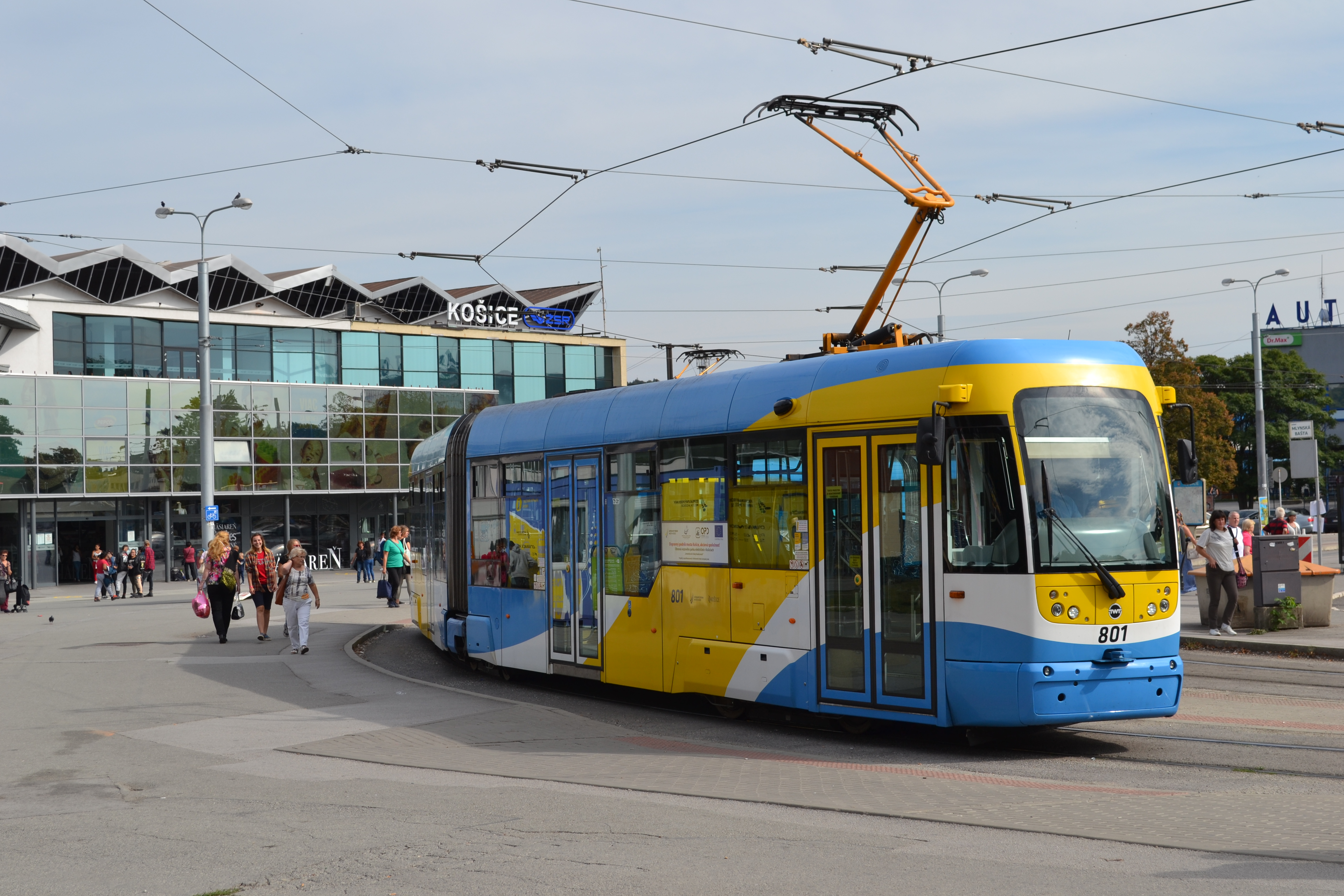
Tram platforms on Station Square, in front of the station

== See also ==
- Old Town, Bratislava - An analogous borough in Slovakia's capital, Bratislava.
