= Košice Music Spring Festival =

The Košice Music Spring Festival is an annual classical music festival held in Košice, Slovakia for one week during the month of May. Founded in 1956, the festival is one of the oldest music festivals in Slovakia and is considered the highlight of Košice's concert season. The festival regularly features performances by the Slovak Philharmonic, the Czech Philharmonic, various chamber ensembles, and opera performances at the State Theatre, Košice. The festival also includes appearances by guest musical ensembles and artists from all over the world.
