= Košice =

City in Slovakia

- City
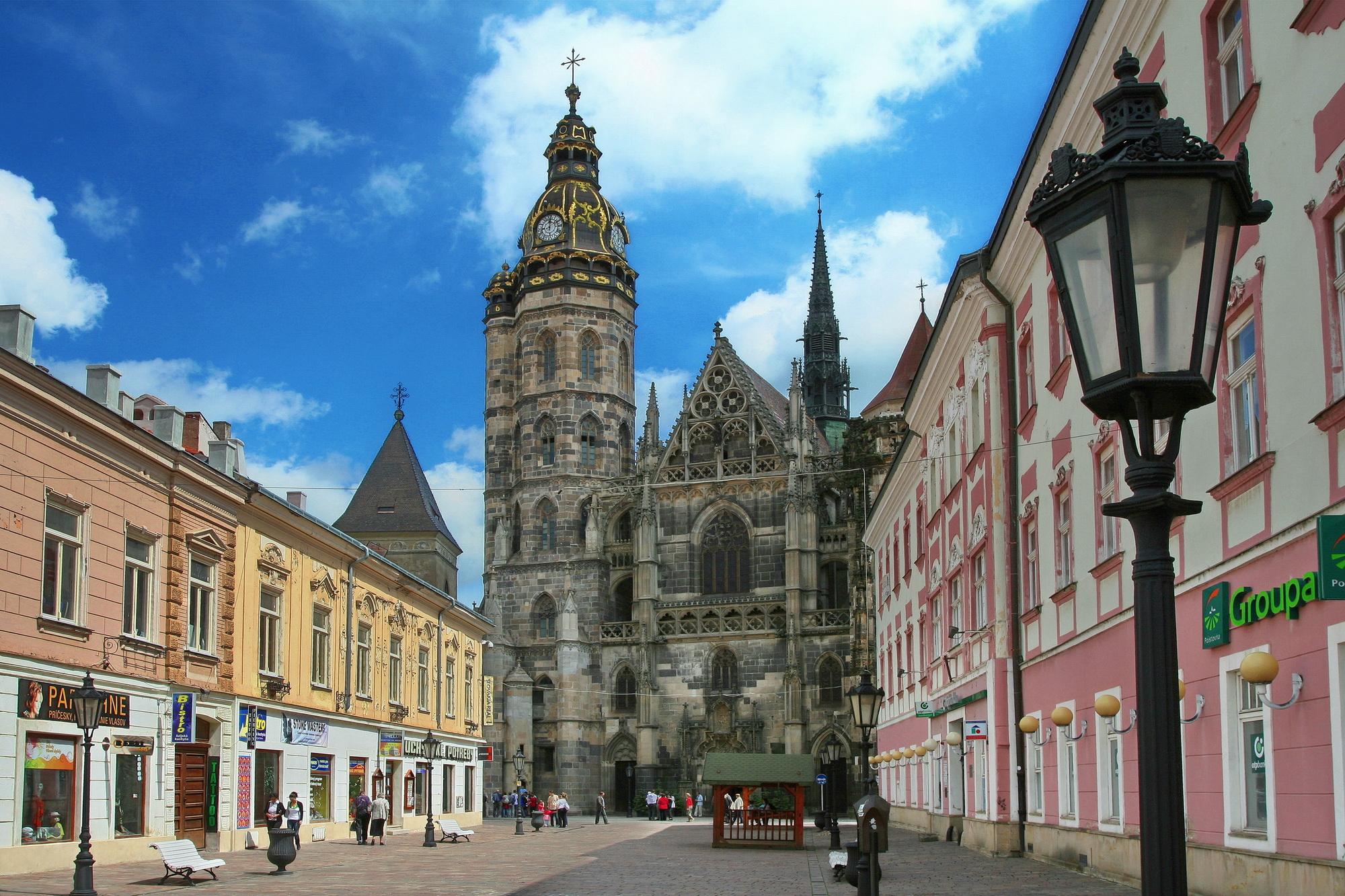
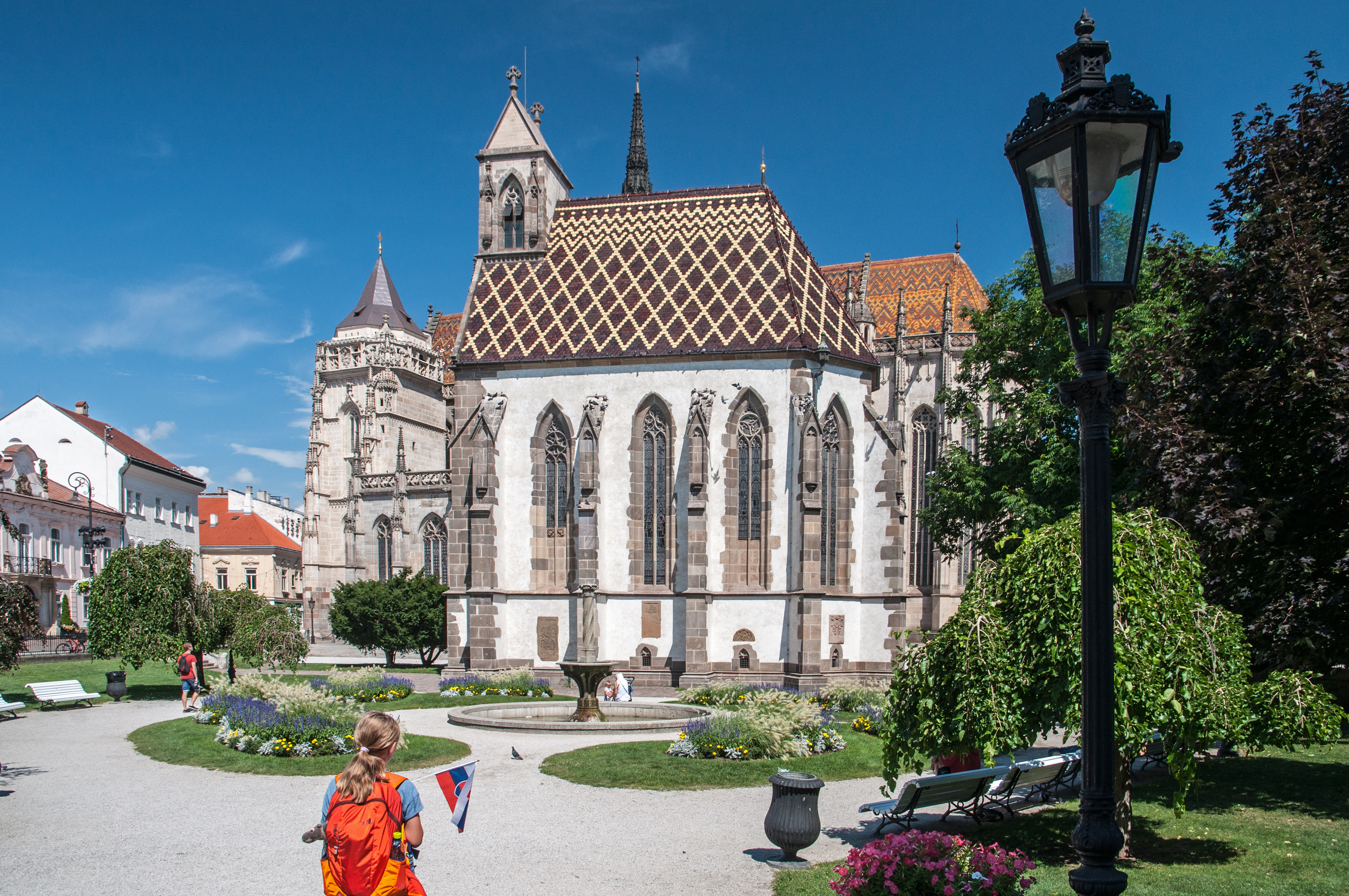
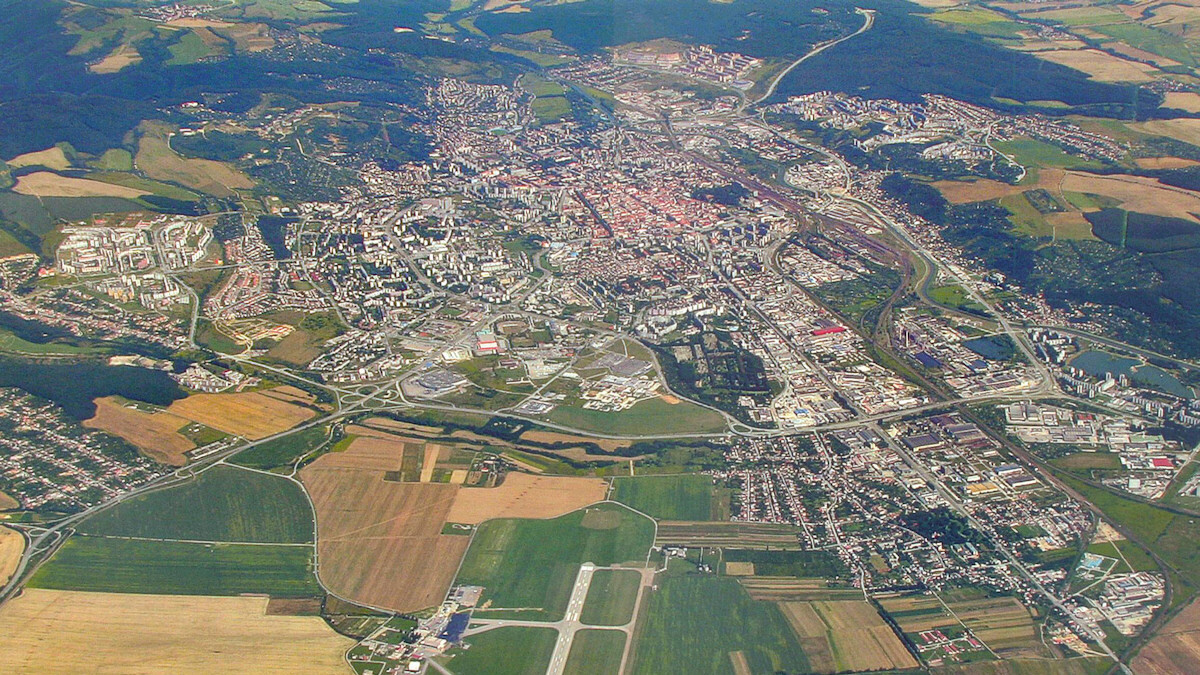
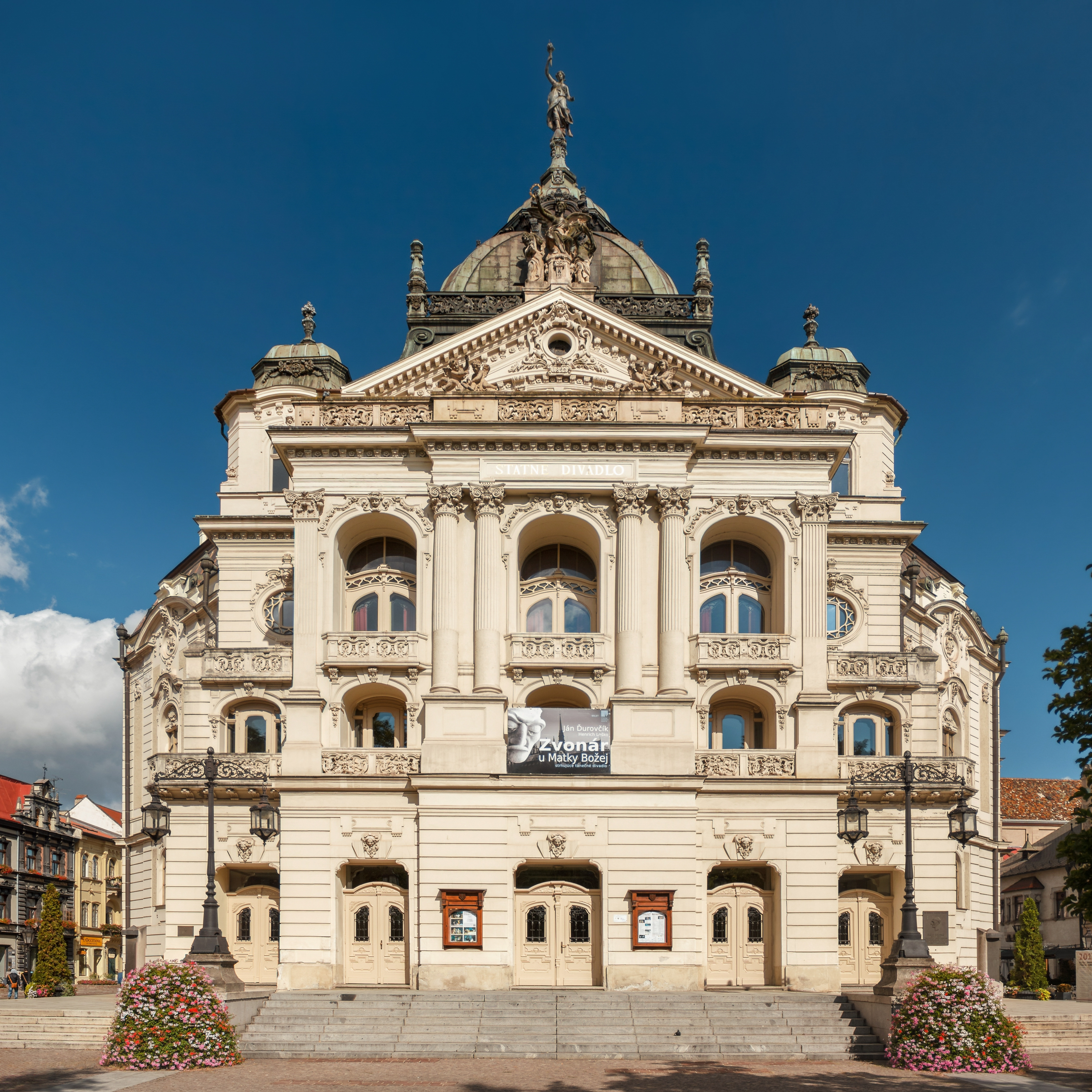
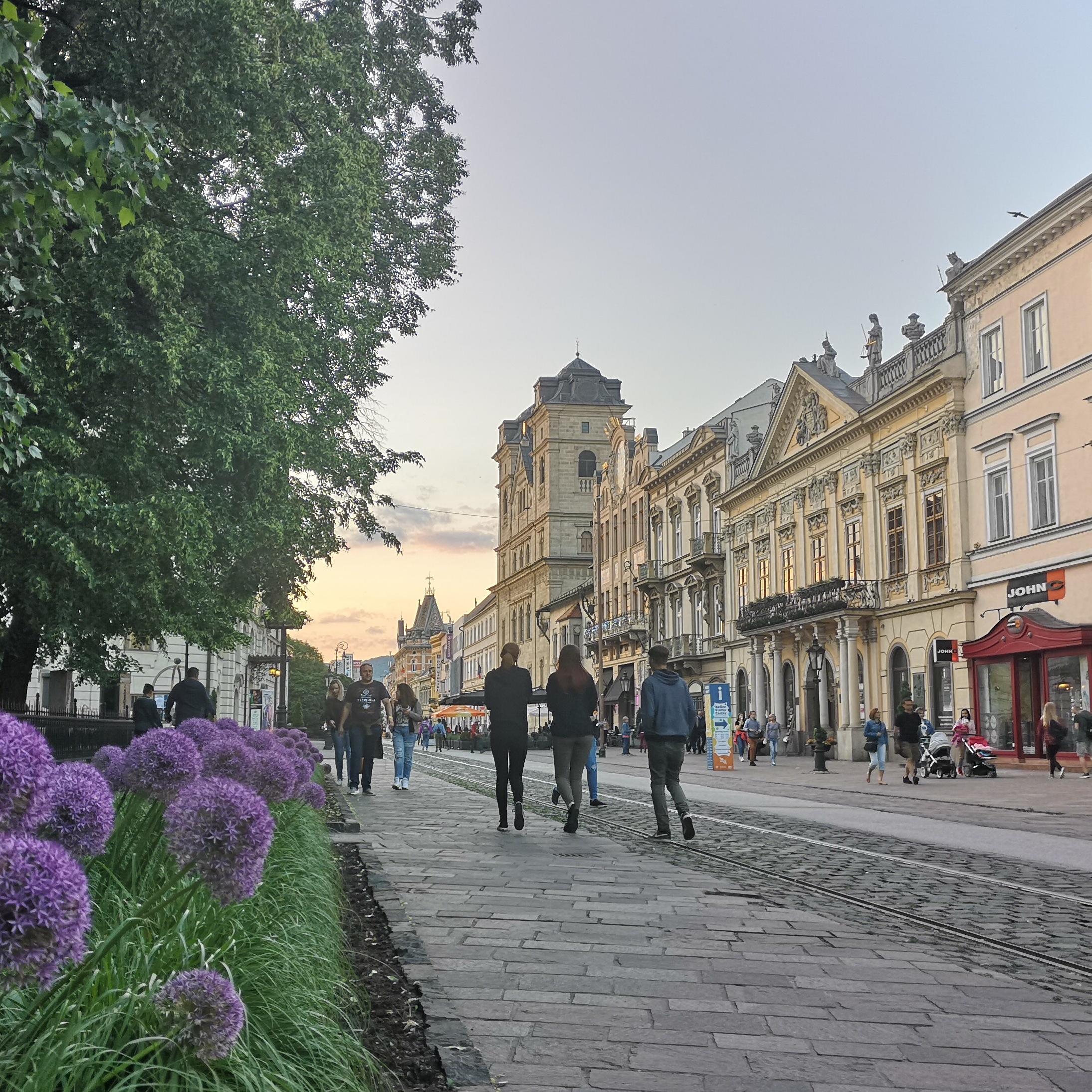
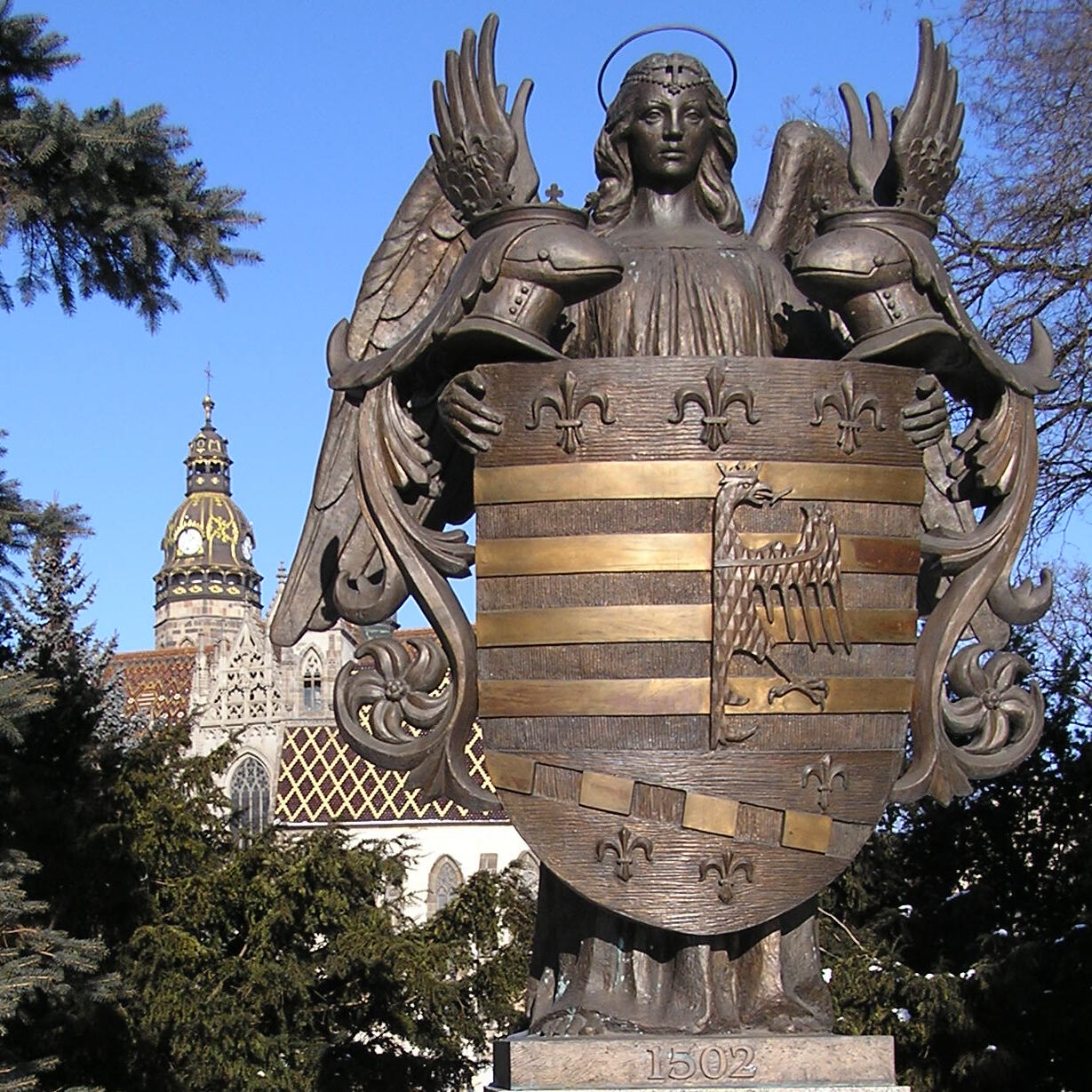
- Cathedral of St. Elizabeth St Michael Chapel General aerial view Košice State Theater Center of Main Street Coat of Arms Statue

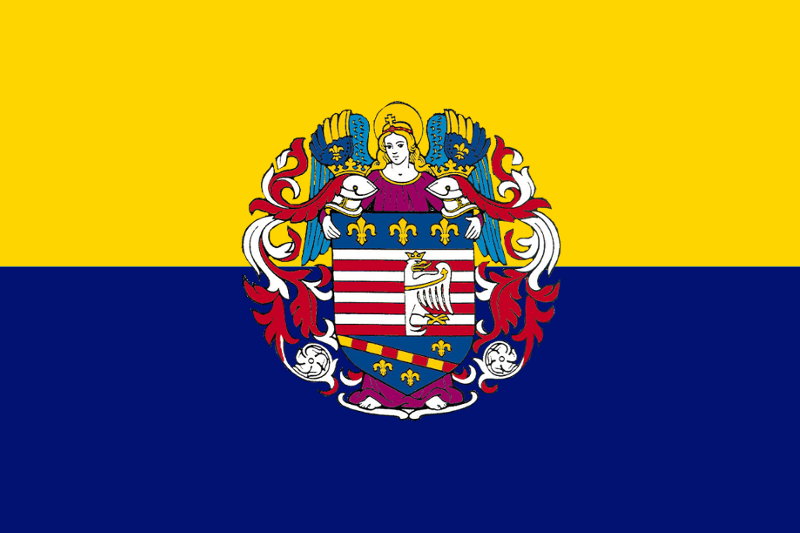
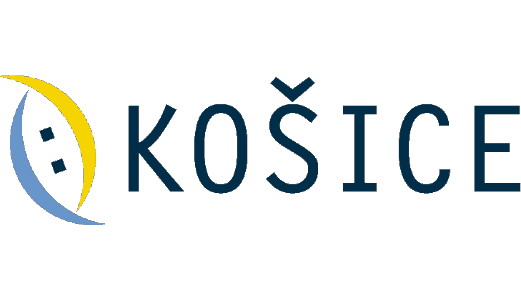
- Flag Coat of arms Logo
- Nickname: City of Tolerance
- Location in Slovakia Location in Košice Region
- Coordinates: 48°43′N 21°15′E
- Country: Slovakia
- Region: Košice Self-governing Region
- District: Košice I, Košice II, Košice III, Košice IV
- First mentioned: 1230

Government
  - Mayor: Ladislav Lörinc (Košice party)

Area
  - City: 243.73 km^{2} (94.10 sq mi)
- Elevation: 255 m (837 ft)

Population (2025)
  - City: 222,286
  - Metro: 368,725
- Demonym(s): Košičan (m.); Košičanka (f.) (sk)
- Time zone: UTC+1 (CET)
  - Summer (DST): UTC+2 (CEST)
- Postal code: 040 00
- Area code: +421-55
- Historical car plate: KE
- GDP: 2017 (Total GDP) 2023 (Per Capita (PPP))
  - Total: Nominal: €18 billion PPP: $21 billion
  - Per capita: Nominal: €18,100; PPP: $34,621
- Website: kosice.sk/en

Košice (Note: Slovak: [ˈkɔʂitse]; UK: /ˈkɒʃɪtsə/ KOSH-it-sə; Hungarian: Kassa [ˈkɒʃʃɒ]; German: Kaschau [ˈkaʃaʊ]; Polish: Коszyce [kɔˈʂɨt͡sɛ]; Rusyn and Russian: Кошице, romanized: Koshitse [ˈkoʂɨtsɨ]; Ukrainian: Кошиці, romanized: Koshytsi [ˈkɔʃɪts⁽ʲ⁾i]) is the largest city in eastern Slovakia. It is situated on the river Hornád at the eastern reaches of the Slovak Ore Mountains, near the border with Hungary and Ukraine. With a population of approximately 230,000, Košice is the second-largest city in Slovakia, after the capital Bratislava.

Being the economic and cultural centre of eastern Slovakia, Košice is the seat of the Košice Region and Košice Self-governing Region, it belongs to the Košice-Prešov agglomeration, and is home to the Slovak Constitutional Court, three universities, various dioceses, and many museums, galleries, and theatres. In 2013, Košice was the European Capital of Culture, together with Marseille, France. Košice is an important industrial centre of Slovakia, and the U. S. Steel Košice steel mill is the largest employer in the city. The town has extensive railway connections and an international airport.

The city has a preserved historical centre which is the largest among Slovak towns. There are heritage protected buildings in Gothic, Renaissance, Baroque, and Art Nouveau styles with Slovakia's largest church: the Cathedral of St. Elizabeth. The long main street, rimmed with aristocratic palaces, Catholic churches, and townsfolk's houses, is a thriving pedestrian zone with boutiques, cafés, and restaurants. The city is known as the first settlement in Europe to be granted its own coat of arms.

== Etymology ==
The first written mention of the city was in 1230 as "Villa Cassa". The name probably comes from the Slavic personal name Koš, Koša → Košici (Koš'people) → Košice (1382–1383) with the patronymic Slavic suffix "-ice" through a natural development in Slovak (similar place names are also known from other Slavic countries). In Hungarian Koša → Kasa, Kassa with a vowel mutation typical for the borrowing of old Slavic names in the region (Vojkovce → Vajkócz, Sokoľ → Szakalya, Szakál, Hodkovce → Hatkóc, etc.). The Latinized form Cassovia became common in the 15th century.

Another theory is a derivation from Old Slovak kosa, "clearing", related to modern Slovak kosiť, "to reap". According to other sources the city name may derive from an old Hungarian first name which begins with "Ko".

Historically, the city has been known as Kaschau (in German), Kassa (in Hungarian), Kaşa (in Turkish), Cassovia (in Latin), Cassovie (in French), Cașovia (in Romanian), Кошице (in Russian, Ukrainian, and Rusyn), Koszyce (in Polish), קאשוי (Kashoy) (in Yiddish), and more. Below is a chronology of the various names:

Year	Name	Year	Name
1230	Villa Cassa	1420	Caschowia
1257	Cassa	1441	Cassovia, Kassa, Kaschau, Košice
1261	Cassa, Cassa-Superior	1613–1684	Cassovia, Kassa, Kaşa, Kossicze
1282	Kossa	1773	Cassovia, Kassa, Kaschau, Kossicze
1300	Cossa	1786	Cassovia, Kascha, Kaschau, Kossice
1307	Cascha	1808	Cassovia, Kaschau, Kassa, Kossice
1324	Casschaw	1863–1913	Kassa
1342	Kassa	1918–1938	Košice
1388	Cassa-Cassouia	1938–1945	Kassa
1394	Cassow	1945–present	Košice

== History ==
Historical affiliations

Kingdom of Hungary 1000–1526
John Zápolya's Eastern Hungarian Kingdom 1526–1551 (Ottoman vassal)
Hajduk rebels of István Bocskai 1604–1606 (Ottoman-backed)
Principality of Transylvania (Ottoman vassal) 1619–1629, 1644–1648
Kuruc rebellion 1672–1682 (Ottoman-backed)
Imre Thököly's Principality of Upper Hungary (Ottoman vassal) 1682–1686
Francis II Rákóczi's insurrection 1703–1711
Kingdom of Hungary (crownland of the Austrian Empire) 1804–1867
Austro-Hungarian Empire 1867–1918
Czechoslovakia 1918–1938
Kingdom of Hungary 1938–1945
Czechoslovakia 1945–1992
Slovakia 1993–present

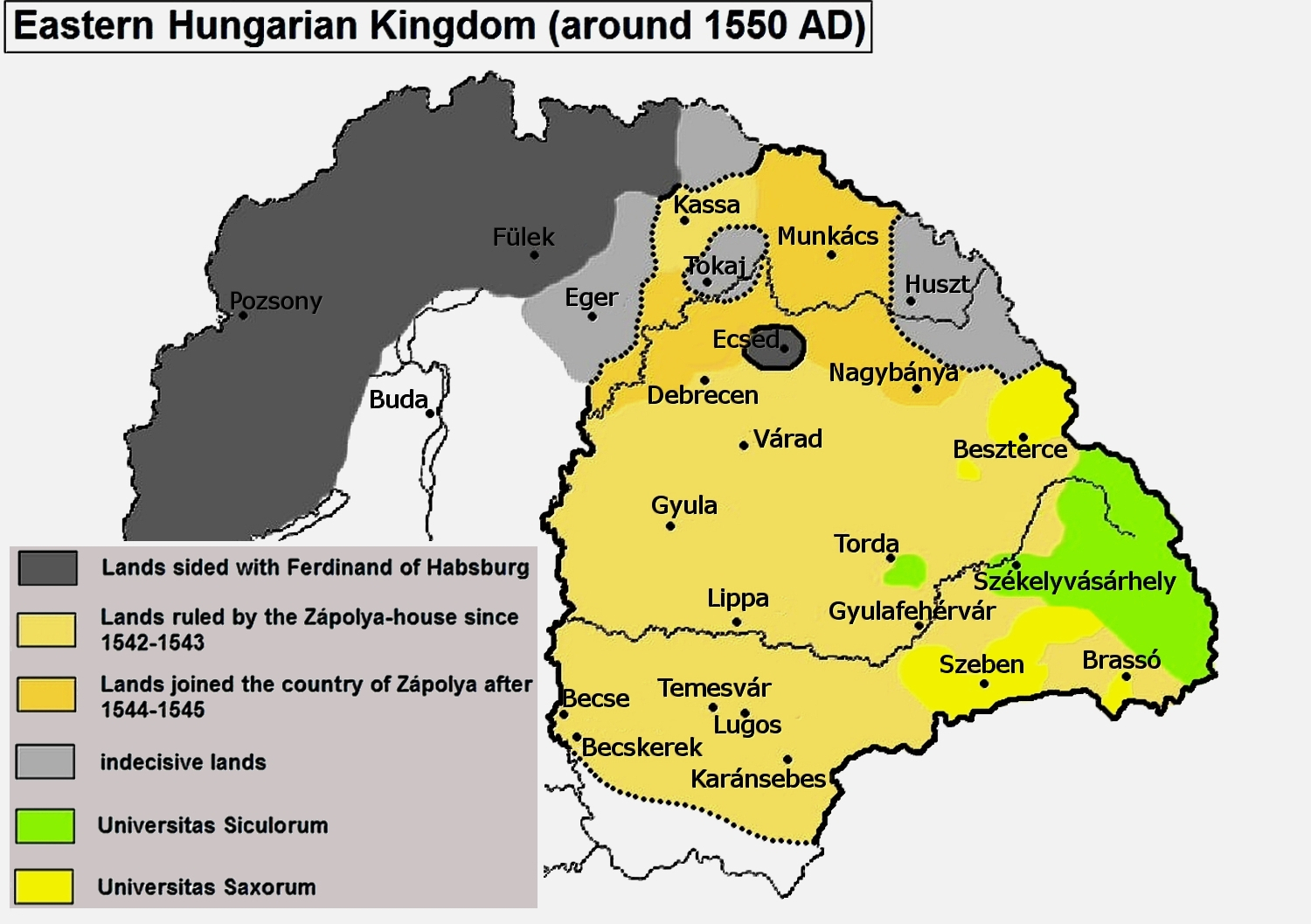
Eastern Hungarian Kingdom around 1550, including Košice shown as Kassa

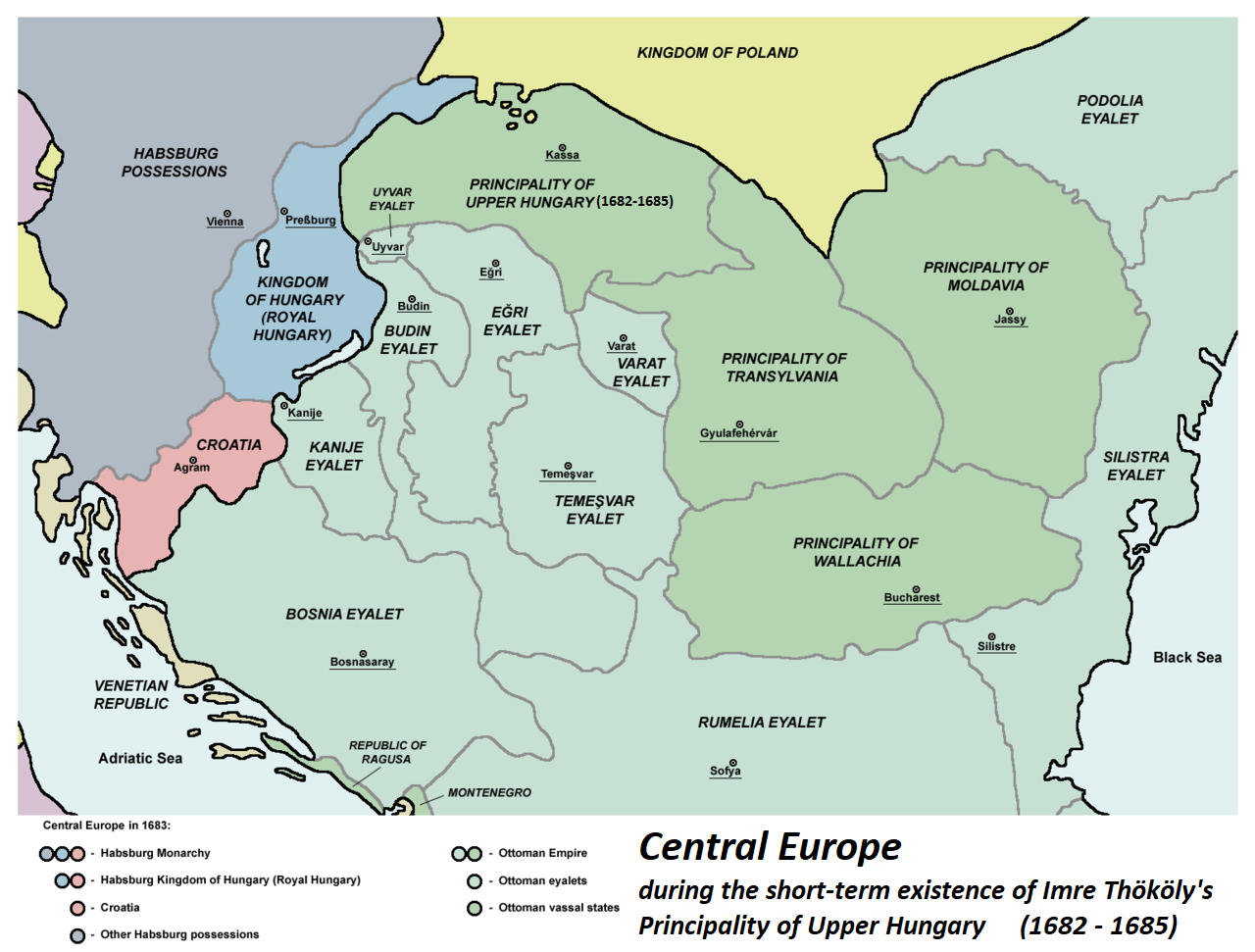
Part of the Ottoman Empire in 1683, including the Principality of Upper Hungary, based around Košice shown as Kassa

The first evidence of habitation can be traced back to the end of the Paleolithic era. The first written reference to the Hungarian town of Košice (as the royal village of Villa Cassa) comes from 1230. After the Mongol invasion in 1241, King Béla IV of Hungary invited German colonists (see Zipser Germans, Germans of Hungary) to fill the gaps in population. The city was in the historic Abaúj County of the Kingdom of Hungary.

There were two independent settlements, Lower Kassa and Upper Kassa, which were amalgamated in the 13th century around the long lens-shaped ring, of today's Main Street (Hlavná ulica). The first known town privileges come from 1290. The town proliferated because of its strategic location on an international trade route from agriculturally rich central Hungary to central Poland, itself part of a longer route connecting the Balkans and the Adriatic and Aegean seas to the Baltic Sea. The privileges given by the king helped develop crafts, business, increasing importance (seat of the royal chamber for Upper Hungary), and for building its strong fortifications. In 1307, the first guild regulations were registered here; they were the oldest in the Kingdom of Hungary.

As a Hungarian free royal town, Košice reinforced the king's troops at the crucial moment of the bloody Battle of Rozgony in 1312 against the strong aristocratic Palatine Amadé Aba (family). In 1347, it became the second-placed city in the hierarchy of the Hungarian free royal towns, with the same rights as the capital Buda. In 1369, it was granted its own coat of arms by Louis I of Hungary. The Diet convened by Louis I in Košice decided that women could inherit the Hungarian throne.

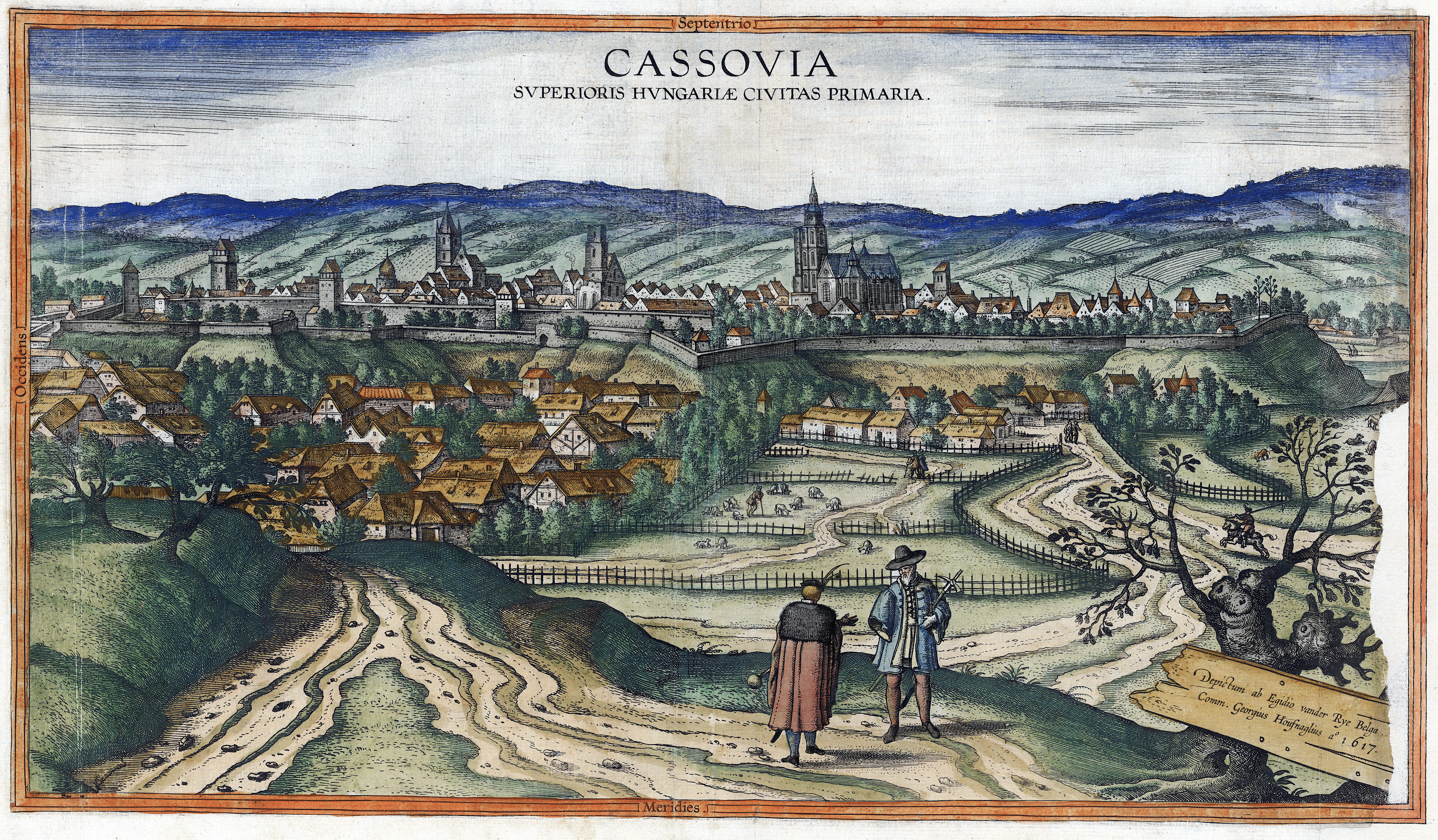
"Cassovia: Superioris Hungariae Civitas Primaria", the prospect from Civitates orbis terrarum. Cassovia (Slovak: Košice, German: Kaschau, Hungarian: Kassa), the "capital" of Upper Hungary in 1617.

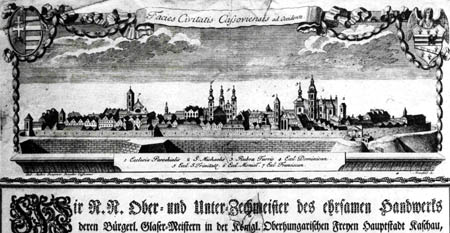
The military base in Košice at the end of the 18th century.

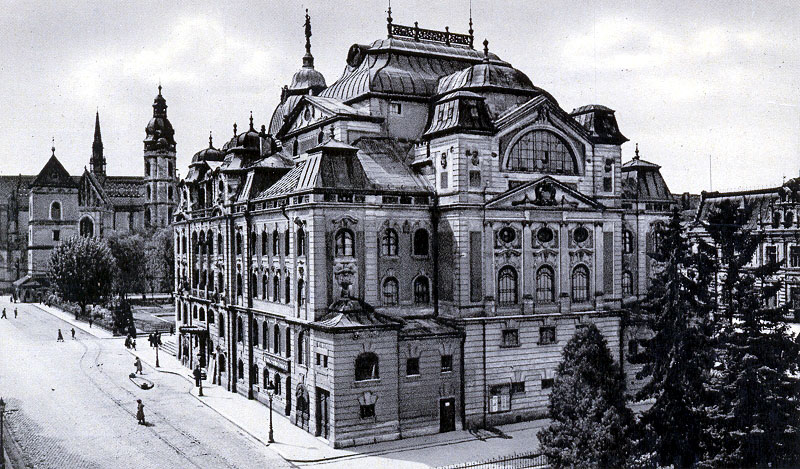
National Theater built in 1899

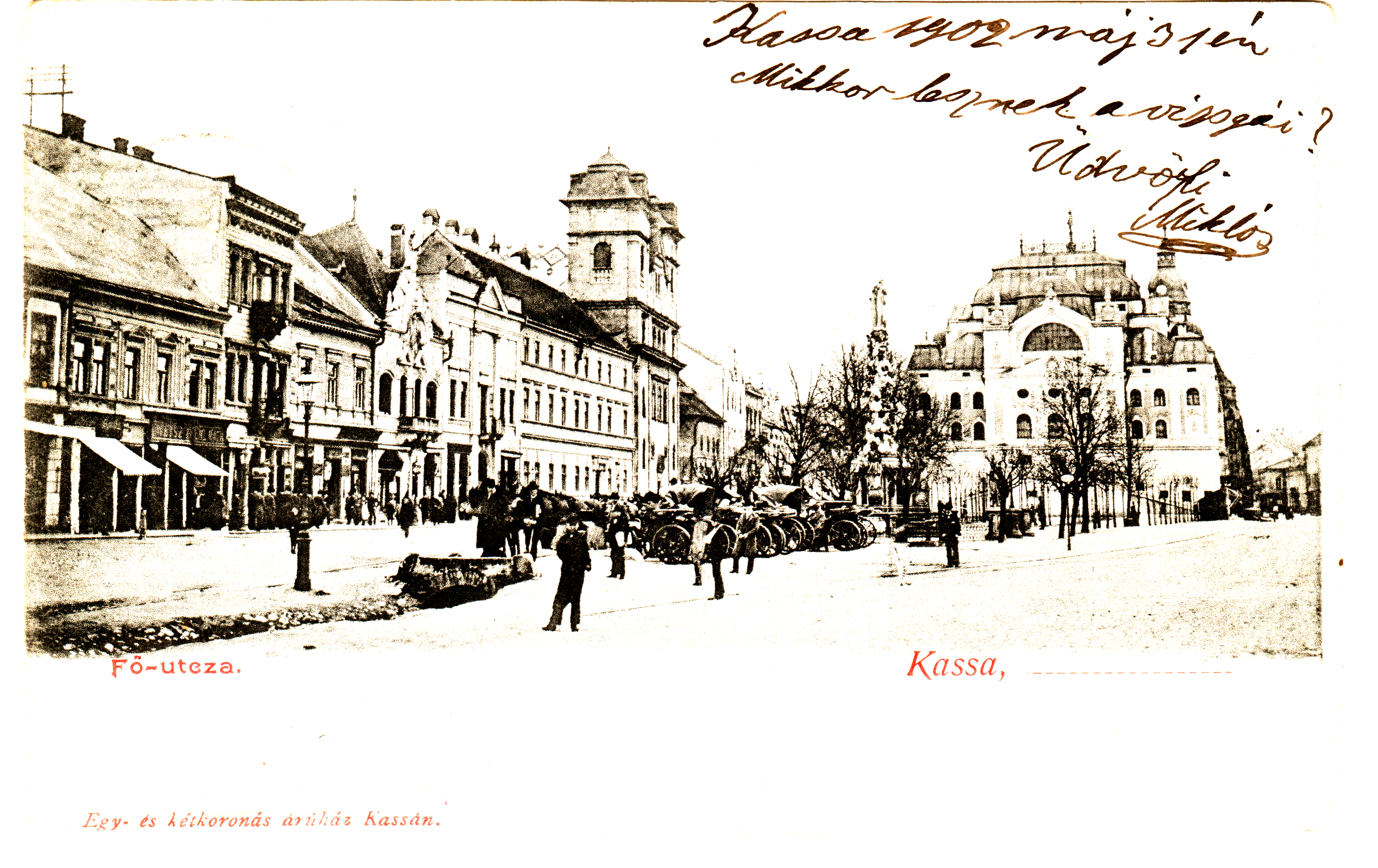
Main Street (1902)

The significance and wealth of the city at the end of the 14th century were mirrored by the decision to build an entirely new church on the grounds of the previously destroyed, smaller St. Elisabeth Church. The construction of the St. Elisabeth Cathedral, the biggest cathedral in the Kingdom of Hungary, was supported by Emperor Sigismund, and by the apostolic see itself. From the beginning of the 15th century, the city played a leading role in the Pentapolitana – the league of the five most important cities in Upper Hungary (Bardejov, Levoča, Košice, Prešov, and Sabinov). During the reign of King Matthias Corvinus, the town reached its medieval population peak. With an estimated 10,000 inhabitants, it was among the largest medieval cities in Europe.

The history of Košice was heavily influenced by the dynastic disputes over the Hungarian throne, which, together with the decline of the continental trade, brought the city into stagnation. Vladislaus III of Varna failed to capture the city in 1441. John Jiskra's mercenaries from Bohemia defeated Tamás Székely's Hungarian army in 1449. John I Albert, Prince of Poland, failed to capture the city during a six-month-long siege in 1491. In 1526, the city paid homage to the Holy Roman Emperor Ferdinand I. John Zápolya captured the town in 1536, but Ferdinand I reconquered it in 1551. In 1554, the settlement became the seat of the Captaincy of Upper Hungary.

=== 17th century ===
In 1604, Catholics seized the Lutheran church in Košice. The Calvinist Stephen Bocskay then occupied Košice during his Protestant insurrection against the Habsburg dynasty, with the backing of the Ottomans. The future George I Rákóczi joined him as a military commander there. Giorgio Basta, commander of the Habsburg forces, failed in his attempt to recapture the city. At the 1606 Treaty of Vienna, in return for giving back territory that included Košice, the rebels won from the Habsburgs a concession of religious toleration for the Magyar nobility and brokered an Austrian-Turkish peace treaty. Stephen Bocskay died in Košice on 29 December 1606 and was interred there.

For some decades during the 17th century, Košice was a part of the Principality of Transylvania, and consequently a part of the Ottoman Empire, and was referred to as Kaşa in Turkish. On 5 September 1619, the prince of Transylvania, Gabriel Bethlen captured Košice with the assistance of the future George I Rákóczi in another anti-Habsburg insurrection. By the Peace of Nikolsburg in 1621, the Habsburgs restored the religious toleration agreement of 1606 and recognized Transylvanian rule over the seven Partium counties: Ugocsa County, Bereg County, Zemplén County, Borsod County, Szabolcs County, Szatmár County, and Abaúj County (including Košice). Bethlen married Catherine von Hohenzollern, of Johann Sigismund Kurfürst von Brandenburg, in Košice in 1626.

After Bethlen died in 1629, Košice and the rest of the Partium were returned to the Habsburgs.

On 18 January 1644, the Diet in Košice elected George I Rákóczi the Prince of Hungary. He took the whole of Upper Hungary and joined the Swedish army besieging Brno for a projected march against Vienna. However, his nominal overlord, the Ottoman Sultan, ordered him to end the campaign, though he did so with gains. In the 1645 Treaty of Linz, Košice returned to Transylvania again as the Habsburgs recognized George's rule over the seven counties of the Partium. He died in 1648, and Košice was returned to the Habsburgs once more.

Subsequently, Košice became a centre of the Counter-Reformation. In 1657, a printing house and university were founded by the Jesuits, funded by Emperor Leopold I. The 1664 Peace of Vasvár at the end of the Austro-Turkish War awarded Szabolcs and Szatmár counties to the Habsburgs, which put once more positioned Košice further inside the borders of Royal Hungary. In the 1670s, the Habsburgs built a modern pentagonal fortress (citadel) south of the city. Also in the 1670s, the city was besieged by Kuruc armies several times, and it again rebelled against the Habsburgs. The rebel leaders were massacred by the Emperor's soldiers on 26 November 1677.

Another rebel leader, Imre Thököly captured the city in 1682, making Kaşa once again a vassal territory of the Ottoman Empire under the Principality of Upper Hungary until 1686. The Austrian field marshal Aeneas de Caprara took Košice back from the Ottomans in late 1685. In 1704–1711, Prince of Transylvania Francis II Rákóczi made Košice the main base in his War for Independence. By 1713, the fortress had been demolished.

When not under Ottoman suzerainty, Košice was the seat of the Habsburg "Captaincy of Upper Hungary" and the seat of the Chamber of Szepes County (Spiš, Zips), which was a subsidiary of the supreme financial agency in Vienna responsible for Upper Hungary. Due to Ottoman occupation of Eger, Košice was the residence of Eger's archbishop from 1596 to 1700.

From 1657, it was the seat of the historic Royal University of Kassa (Universitas Cassoviensis), founded by Bishop Benedict Kishdy. The university was transformed into a Royal Academy in 1777, then into a Law Academy in the 19th century. It was to cease to exist in the turbulent year 1921. After the end of the anti-Habsburg uprisings in 1711, the victorious Austrian armies drove the Ottoman Army back to the south, and this major territorial change created new trade routes that circumvented Košice. The city began to decline and, from a rich medieval town, became a provincial town known for its military base, and was mainly dependent on agriculture.

In 1723, the Immaculata statue was erected on the site of a former gallows on Main Street (Hlavná ulica) to commemorate the plague of 1710–1711. The city also became one of the centers of the Hungarian linguistic revival, including the publication of the first Hungarian-language periodical, called the Magyar Museum, in Hungary in 1788. The city's walls were demolished step by step from the early 19th century to 1856; only the Executioner's Bastion remained among limited parts of the wall. The city became the seat of its own bishopric in 1802. The city's surroundings became a theater of war again during the Revolutions of 1848, when the Imperial cavalry general Franz Schlik defeated the Hungarian army on 8 December 1848 and 4 January 1849. The city was captured by the Hungarian army on 15 February 1849, but the Russian troops drove them back on 24 June 1849.

In 1828, there were three manufacturers and 460 workshops. The first factories were established in the 1840s (sugar and nail factories). The first telegram message arrived in 1856, and the railway connected the city to Miskolc in 1860. In 1873, there were already connections to Prešov, Žilina, and Chop (in today's Ukraine). The city gained a public transit system in 1891 when the track was laid down for a horse-drawn tramway. The traction was electrified in 1914. In 1906, Francis II Rákóczi's house of Rodostó was reproduced in Košice, and his remains were buried in the St. Elisabeth Cathedral.

After World War I and during the gradual break-up of Austria-Hungary, the city at first became a part of the transient Eastern Slovak Republic, declared on 11 December 1918, in Košice and earlier in Prešov under the protection of Hungary. On 29 December 1918, the Czechoslovak Legions entered the city, making it part of the newly established Czechoslovakia. However, in June 1919, Košice was occupied again, as part of the Slovak Soviet Republic, a proletarian puppet state of Hungary. The Czechoslovak troops secured the city for Czechoslovakia in July 1919, which was later upheld under the terms of the Treaty of Trianon in 1920.

=== Fate of Košice Jews ===
Jews had lived in Košice since the 16th century, but were not allowed to settle permanently. There is a document identifying the local coiner in 1524 as a Jew and claiming that his predecessor was a Jew as well. Jews were allowed to enter the city during the town fair, but were forced to leave it by night, and lived mostly in nearby Rozunfaca. In 1840, the ban was removed, and a few Jews were living in the town, among them a widow who ran a small Kosher restaurant for the Jewish merchants passing through the town.

Košice was ceded to Hungary by the First Vienna Award from 1938 until early 1945. The town was bombarded on 26 June 1941, by a still unidentified aircraft, in what became a pretext for the Hungarian government to declare war on the Soviet Union a day later.

The German occupation of Hungary led to the deportation and almost certain extermination of Košice's entire Jewish population of 12,000 and an additional 2,000 from surrounding areas via cattle cars to Nazi concentration camps. A concentration camp was established in Košice under Hungarian László Csatáry (1915–2013). In 1948, Csatary was tried and sentenced to death in absentia in Czechoslovakia, but he fled to Canada. Canadian officials accused him of lying about his wartime activities and, in 1997, stripped him of his citizenship. He was discovered living in Budapest in 2011 and detained there. He was arrested on 18 June 2013, aged 98, and died before trial on 12 August 2013.

In 1946, after the war, Košice was the site of an orthodox festival, with a Mizrachi convention and a Bnei Akiva Yeshiva (school) for Jews, which, later that year, moved with its students to Israel.

A memorial plaque in honor of the 12,000 deported and exterminated Jews from Košice and the surrounding areas in Slovakia was unveiled at the pre-war Košice Orthodox synagogue in 1992.

=== Soviet occupation ===
The Soviet Union captured the town in January 1945, and for a short time, it became a temporary capital of the restored Czechoslovak Republic until the Soviets' Red Army reached Prague. Among other acts, the Košice Government Programme was declared on 5 April 1945.

A large population of ethnic Germans in the area was expelled and sent on foot to Germany or to the Soviet border.

After the Communist Party of Czechoslovakia seized power in Czechoslovakia in February 1948, the city became part of the Eastern Bloc. Several cultural institutions that still exist were founded, and large residential areas around the city were built. The construction and expansion of the East Slovak Ironworks caused the population to grow from 60,700 in 1950 to 235,000 in 1991. Before the Velvet Divorce, it was the fifth-largest city in the federation.

=== Under Slovakia ===
Following the Velvet Divorce and creation of the Slovak Republic, Košice became the second-largest city in the country and became the seat of the Slovak Constitutional Court. Since 1995, it has been the seat of the Archdiocese of Košice.

After the 2022 Russian invasion of Ukraine, Košice, as a regional metropolitan area, became a major hub for administration, transfer and housing of refugees fleeing from Ukraine.

== Geography ==
The municipality lies at an altitude of 255 metres (837 ft) and covers an area of 243.73 km^{2} (94.10 sq mi) (2025). It is located in eastern Slovakia, about 20 kilometres (12 mi) from the Hungarian border, 80 kilometres (50 mi) from the Ukrainian border, and 90 kilometres (56 mi) from the Polish border. It is about 400 kilometres (249 mi) east of Slovakia's capital Bratislava and a chain of villages connects it to neighboring Prešov, which is about 36 kilometres (22 mi) to the north.

Košice is on the Hornád river in the Košice Basin, at the easternmost reaches of the Slovak Ore Mountains. More precisely, it is a subdivision of the Black Mountain (Čierna hora) mountains in the northwest and Volovec Mountains (Volovské vrchy) mountains in the southwest. The basin is met on the east by the Slanské Hills (Slanské vrchy) mountains.

== Climate ==
Košice has a humid continental climate (Köppen: Dfb, Trewartha: Dcbo), as the city lies in the north temperate zone. The city has four distinct seasons with long, warm summers with cool nights and long, cold, and snowy winters. Precipitation varies little throughout the year, with abundant precipitation that falls during summer and only a few during winter. The coldest month is January, with an average temperature of −2.6 °C (27.3 °F), and the hottest month is July, with an average temperature of 19.3 °C (66.7 °F).

Climate data for Košice, Slovakia (1991–2020 normals, extremes 1951–present)
Month	Jan	Feb	Mar	Apr	May	Jun	Jul	Aug	Sep	Oct	Nov	Dec	Year
Record high °C (°F)	13.2 (55.8)	16.4 (61.5)	25.4 (77.7)	28.7 (83.7)	32.0 (89.6)	36.0 (96.8)	38.5 (101.3)	37.4 (99.3)	34.1 (93.4)	26.6 (79.9)	22.4 (72.3)	13.4 (56.1)	38.5 (101.3)
Mean daily maximum °C (°F)	1.0 (33.8)	3.7 (38.7)	9.9 (49.8)	16.5 (61.7)	21.2 (70.2)	24.8 (76.6)	26.6 (79.9)	26.8 (80.2)	21.2 (70.2)	14.8 (58.6)	8.2 (46.8)	1.8 (35.2)	14.7 (58.5)
Daily mean °C (°F)	−1.9 (28.6)	0.0 (32.0)	4.7 (40.5)	10.9 (51.6)	15.5 (59.9)	19.2 (66.6)	20.8 (69.4)	20.5 (68.9)	15.2 (59.4)	9.7 (49.5)	4.5 (40.1)	−0.7 (30.7)	9.9 (49.8)
Mean daily minimum °C (°F)	−4.8 (23.4)	−3.6 (25.5)	0.0 (32.0)	5.0 (41.0)	9.6 (49.3)	13.2 (55.8)	14.8 (58.6)	14.6 (58.3)	10.1 (50.2)	5.3 (41.5)	1.2 (34.2)	−3.3 (26.1)	5.2 (41.4)
Record low °C (°F)	−26.9 (−16.4)	−22.3 (−8.1)	−17.1 (1.2)	−7.3 (18.9)	−2.6 (27.3)	−0.4 (31.3)	4.2 (39.6)	2.7 (36.9)	−3.4 (25.9)	−8.6 (16.5)	−14.0 (6.8)	−21.3 (−6.3)	−26.9 (−16.4)
Average precipitation mm (inches)	25.7 (1.01)	26.8 (1.06)	23.6 (0.93)	42.4 (1.67)	69.4 (2.73)	87.5 (3.44)	93.5 (3.68)	66.5 (2.62)	50.1 (1.97)	51.1 (2.01)	40.2 (1.58)	36.1 (1.42)	613.0 (24.13)
Average precipitation days (≥ 1.0 mm)	12.7	10.8	9.0	10.8	13.3	13.4	12.9	9.7	10.7	11.0	11.9	14.2	140.4
Average snowy days	14.0	10.9	5.0	1.5	0.0	0.0	0.0	0.0	0.0	0.5	4.8	12.7	50.4
Average relative humidity (%)	84.5	78.7	68.4	61.7	66.0	66.8	67.0	66.3	71.6	78.1	83.5	86.0	73.2
Mean monthly sunshine hours	57.0	83.9	155.5	200.5	239.9	253.4	258.9	264.7	189.4	131.0	66.7	41.0	1,941.9
Source 1: World Meteorological Organisation
Source 2: SHMÚ (extremes, 1951–present)

== Population ==
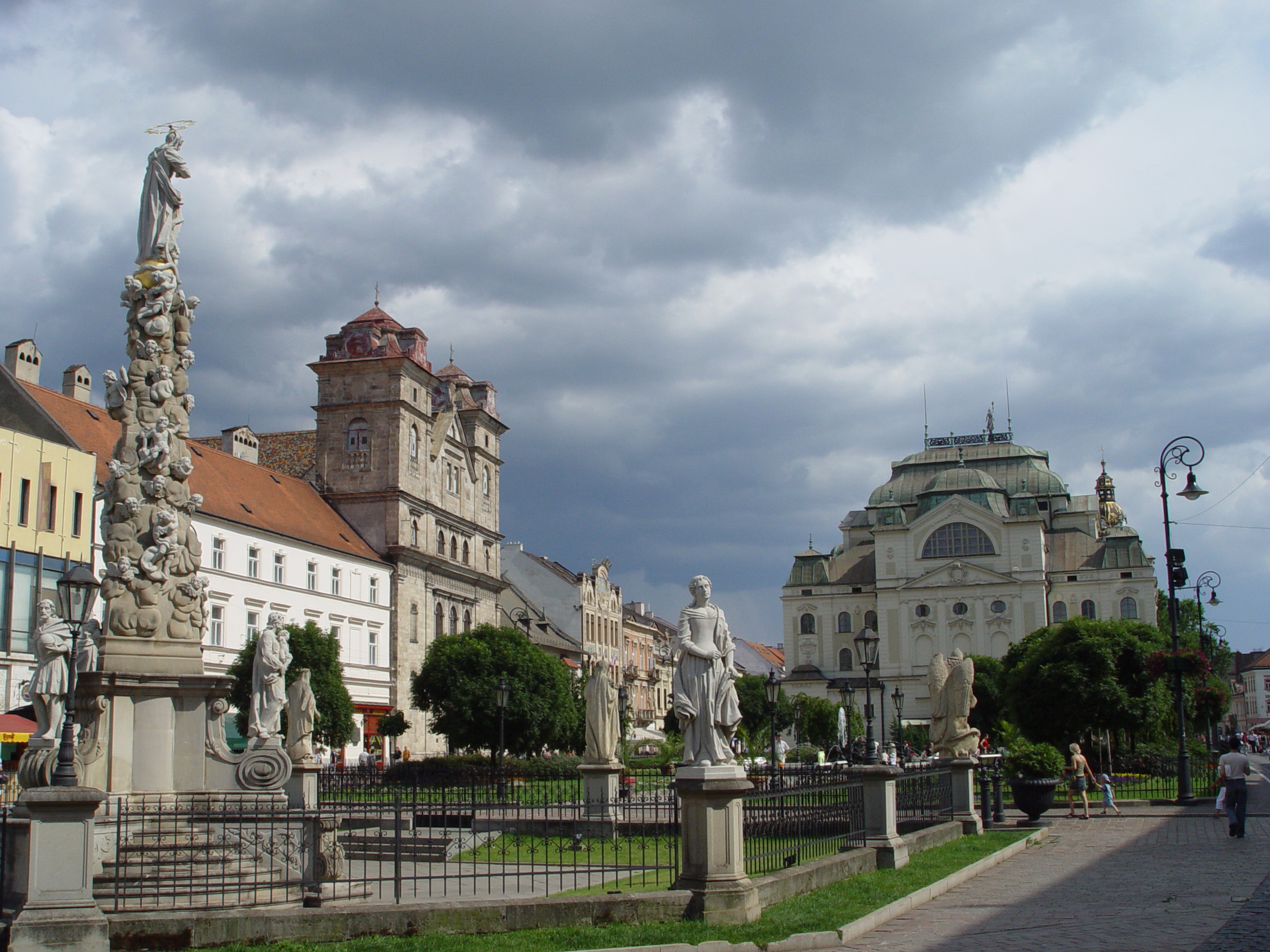
Main Street (Hlavná ulica) in historic downtown

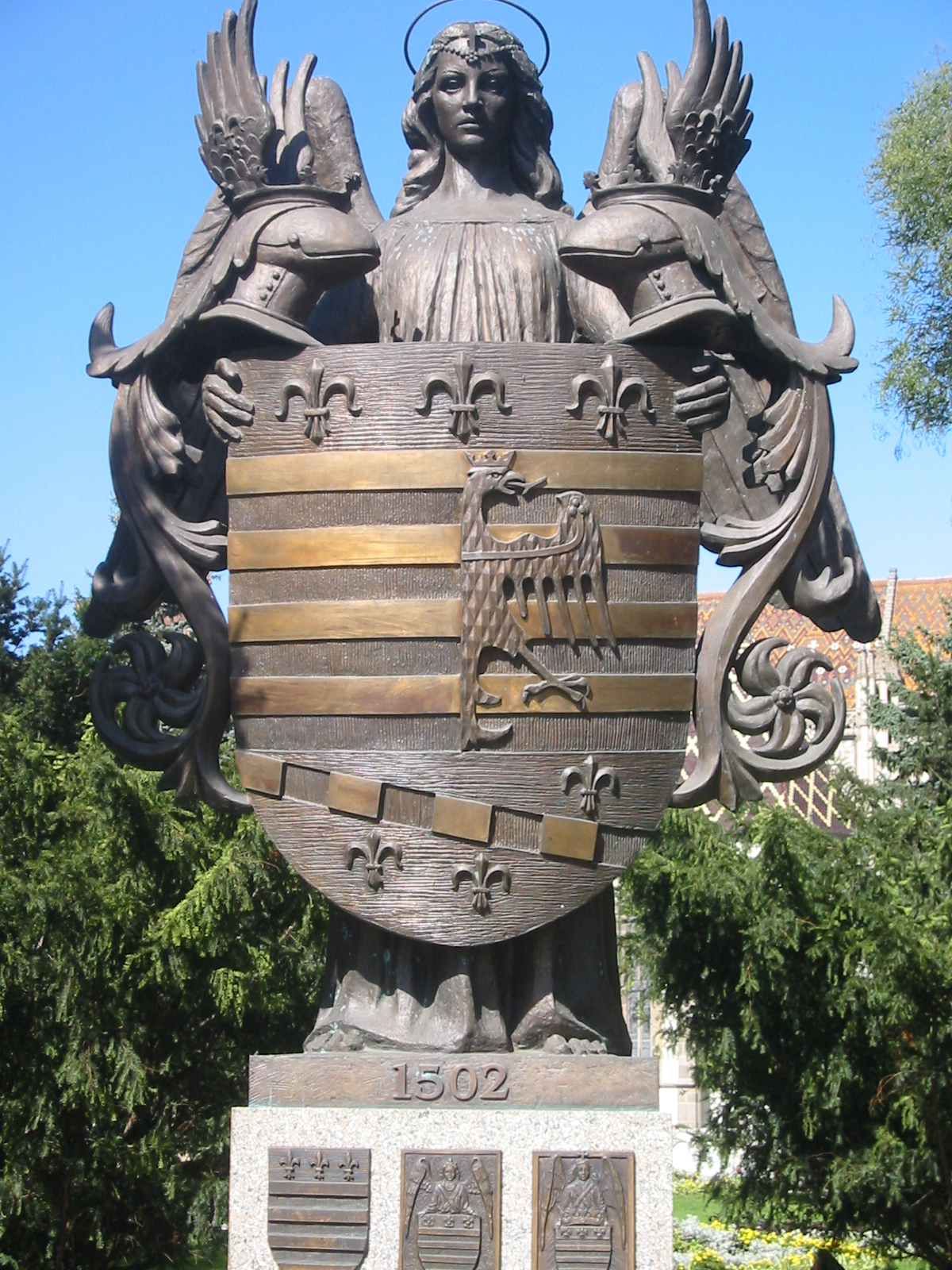
Statue of Košice's coat of arms, the first municipal coat of arms in Europe

Historical population
Year	Pop.	±%
1869	21,700	—
1890	28,900	+33.2%
1910	44,200	+52.9%
1921	52,900	+19.7%
1930	70,111	+32.5%
1950	60,700	−13.4%
1961	79,400	+30.8%
1970	149,555	+88.4%
1980	202,368	+35.3%
1991	235,160	+16.2%
2001	236,093	+0.4%
2011	240,688	+1.9%
2021	229,040	−4.8%

Population statistic (10 years)
Year	1995	2005	2015	2025
Count	240,915	234,871	239,200	222,286
Difference		−2.50%	+1.84%	−7.07%

Population statistic
Year	2024	2025
Count	223,678	222,286
Difference		−0.62%

Košice has a population of 222,286 people (31 December 2025).

=== Ethnicity ===
Census 2021 (1+%)
Ethnicity	Number	Fraction
Slovak	194,185	80.3%
Not found out	23,062	9.53%
Hungarian	7807	3.22%
Romani	5419	2.24%
Rusyn	4108	1.69%
Czech	2460	1.01%
Total	241,812	

In year 2021 was 241,812 people by ethnicity 194,185 as Slovak, 23,062 as Not found out, 7807 as Hungarian, 5419 as Romani, 4108 as Rusyn, 2460 as Czech, 1177 as Other, 1033 as Ukrainian, 519 as German, 402 as Vietnamese, 388 as Russian, 211 as Polish, 200 as Jewish, 93 as Moravian, 88 as English, 85 as Italian, 77 as Bulgarian, 68 as Serbian, 61 as Albanian, 59 as French, 47 as Chinese, 44 as Romanian, 44 as Greek, 35 as Croatian, 33 as Irish, 32 as Austrian, 30 as Canadian, 24 as Turkish, 12 as Silesian, 6 as Iranian and 3 as Korean.

Note on population: The difference values of population numbers in the table "Population statistic" and in the sections "Ethnicity" & "Religion" is caused by the use of various statistical methods.

=== Religion ===
Census 2021 (1+%)
Religion	Number	Fraction
Roman Catholic Church	101,870	44.48%
None	64,935	28.35%
Not found out	26,110	11.4%
Greek Catholic Church	15,186	6.63%
Evangelical Church	7510	3.28%
Calvinist Church	4504	1.97%
Eastern Orthodox Church	2979	1.3%
Total	229,040	

In year 2021 was 229,040 people by religion 101,870 from Roman Catholic Church, 64,935 from None, 26,110 from Not found out, 15,186 from Greek Catholic Church, 7510 from Evangelical Church, 4504 from Calvinist Church, 2979 from Eastern Orthodox Church, 780 from Other, 774 from Ad hoc movements, 766 from Jehovah's Witnesses, 764 from Apostolic Church, 534 from Other and not ascertained christian church, 451 from Christian Congregations in Slovakia, 375 from Buddhism, 252 from Baptists Church, 239 from Jewish community, 226 from Islam, 197 from Seventh-day Adventist Church, 167 from Paganism and natural spirituality, 133 from Church of the Brethren, 106 from United Methodist Church, 50 from Hinduism, 47 from Old Catholic Church, 33 from Czechoslovak Hussite Church, 28 from Bahá'i Community, 19 from Church of Jesus Christ of Latter-day Saints and 5 from New Apostolic Church.

=== Historical demographics ===
According to the researchers the town had a German majority until the mid-16th century. The Ottoman Turkish traveller Evliya Çelebi mentioned that the city was inhabited by "Hungarians, Germans, Upper Hungarians" in 1661 when the city was under the suzerainty of the Ottoman Empire and under Turkish control. But by 1850, the Slovaks gained a plurality of 46.5%, with Hungarians reduced to 28.5% and Germans at 15.6%.

The linguistic makeup of the town's population underwent historical changes that alternated between the growth of the ratio of those who claimed Hungarian and those who claimed Slovak as their language. With a population of 28,884 in 1891, just under half (49.9%) of the inhabitants of Košice declared Hungarian, then the official language, as their main means of communication, 33.6% Slovak, and 13.5% German; 72.2% were Roman Catholics, 11.4% Jews, 7.3% Lutherans, 6.7% Greek Catholics, and 4.3% Calvinists. The results of that census are questioned by some historians by claims that they were manipulated, to increase the percentage of the Magyars during a period of Magyarization.

By the 1910 census, which is sometimes accused of being manipulated by the ruling Hungarian bureaucracy, 75.4% of the 44,211 inhabitants claimed Hungarian, 14.8% Slovak, 7.2% German and 1.8% Polish. The Jews were split among other groups by the 1910 census, as only the most frequently-used language, not ethnicity, was registered. The population around 1910 was multidenominational and multiethnic, and the differences in the level of education mirror the stratification of society. The town's linguistic balance began to shift towards Slovak after World War I by Slovakization in the newly established Czechoslovakia.

Ethnic composition of Košice between 1850 and 1921
Ethnic group	census 1850	census 1880	census 1890	census 1900	census 1910	census 1921
Hungarians	28.5%	39.8%	49.9%	66.3%	75.4%	21.2%
Slovaks	46.5%	40.9%	33.6%	22.9%	14.8%	59.7%
Germans	15.6%	16.7%	13.5%	8.1%	7.2%	4.0%

According to the 1930 census, the city had a population of 70,111, with 230 Gypsies (today Roma), 42,245 Czechoslovaks (today Czechs and Slovaks), 11,504 Hungarians, 3,354 Germans, 44 Poles, 14 Romanians, 801 Ruthenians, 27 Serbocroatians (today Serbs and Croatians), and 5,733 Jews.

As a consequence of the First and Second Vienna Awards, Košice was ceded to Hungary. Starting on 15 May 1944, during the German occupation of Hungary towards the end of World War II, approximately 10,000 Jews were deported by the Nazis, with the enthusiastic assistance of the Hungarian Interior Ministry and its gendarmerie (the csendőrség). The last transport to Auschwitz left the city on 2 June, three months before the Arrow Cross Party gained control over Hungary. The ethnic makeup of the town was dramatically changed by the persecution of the town's large Hungarian majority, population exchanges between Hungary and Slovakia and Slovakization and by mass migration of Slovaks into newly built communist-block-microdistricts, also known as paneláks, which increased the population of Košice four times by 1989 and made it the fastest growing city in Czechoslovakia.

Historical population

Year	Pop.	±%
1480	10,000	—
1700	4,000	−60.0%
1800	8,000	+100.0%
1820	8,700	+8.7%
1846	13,700	+57.5%
1869	21,700	+58.4%
1890	28,900	+33.2%

Year	Pop.	±%
1910	44,200	+52.9%
1921	52,900	+19.7%
1930	70,000	+32.3%
1942	67,000	−4.3%
1950	60,700	−9.4%
1961	79,400	+30.8%
1970	142,200	+79.1%

Year	Pop.	±%
1980	202,400	+42.3%
1991	235,160	+16.2%
2001	236,093	+0.4%
2011	240,688	+1.9%
2021	229,040	−4.8%

== Culture ==
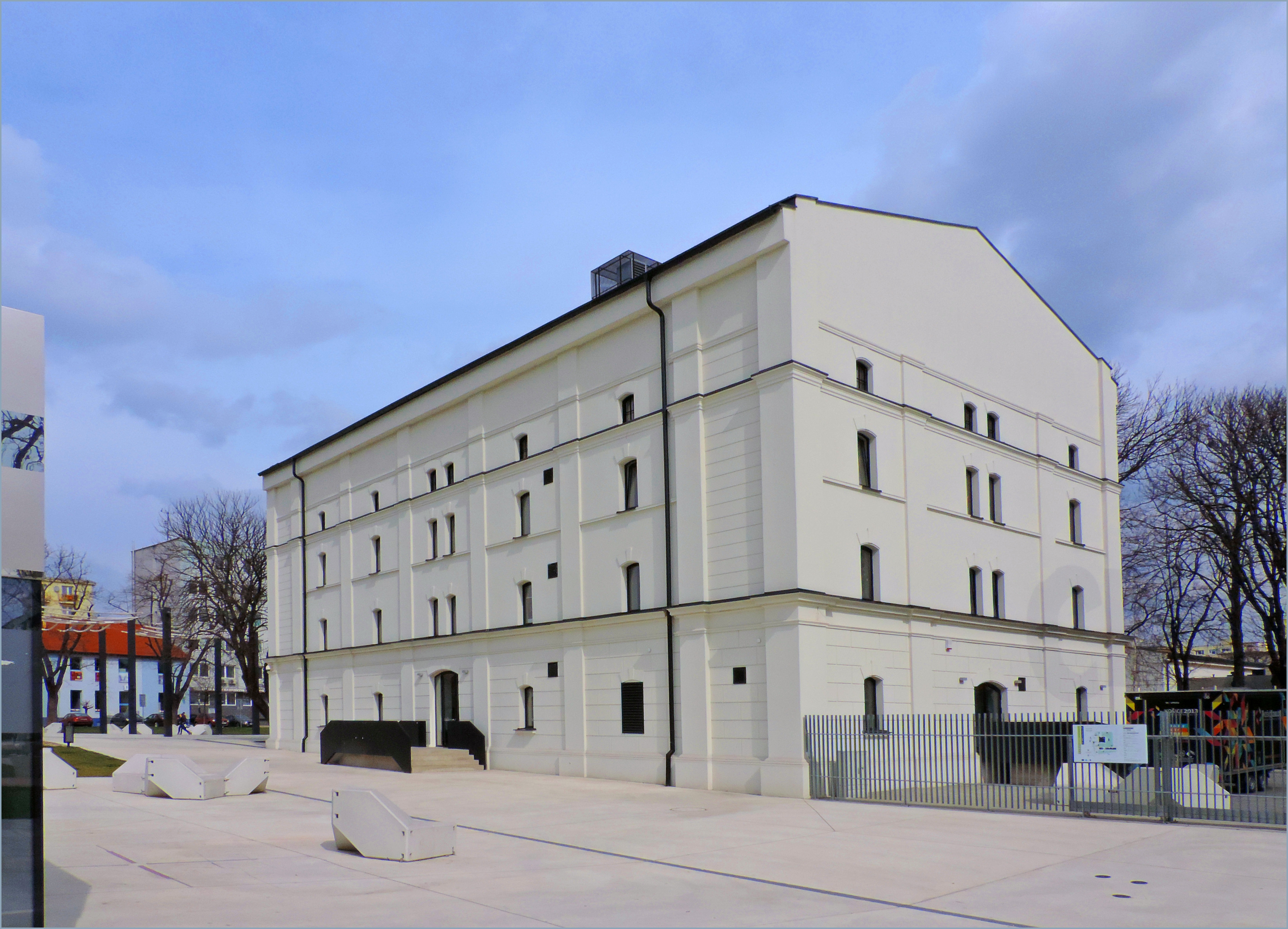
Barracks Cultural Park (Kasárne Kulturpark)

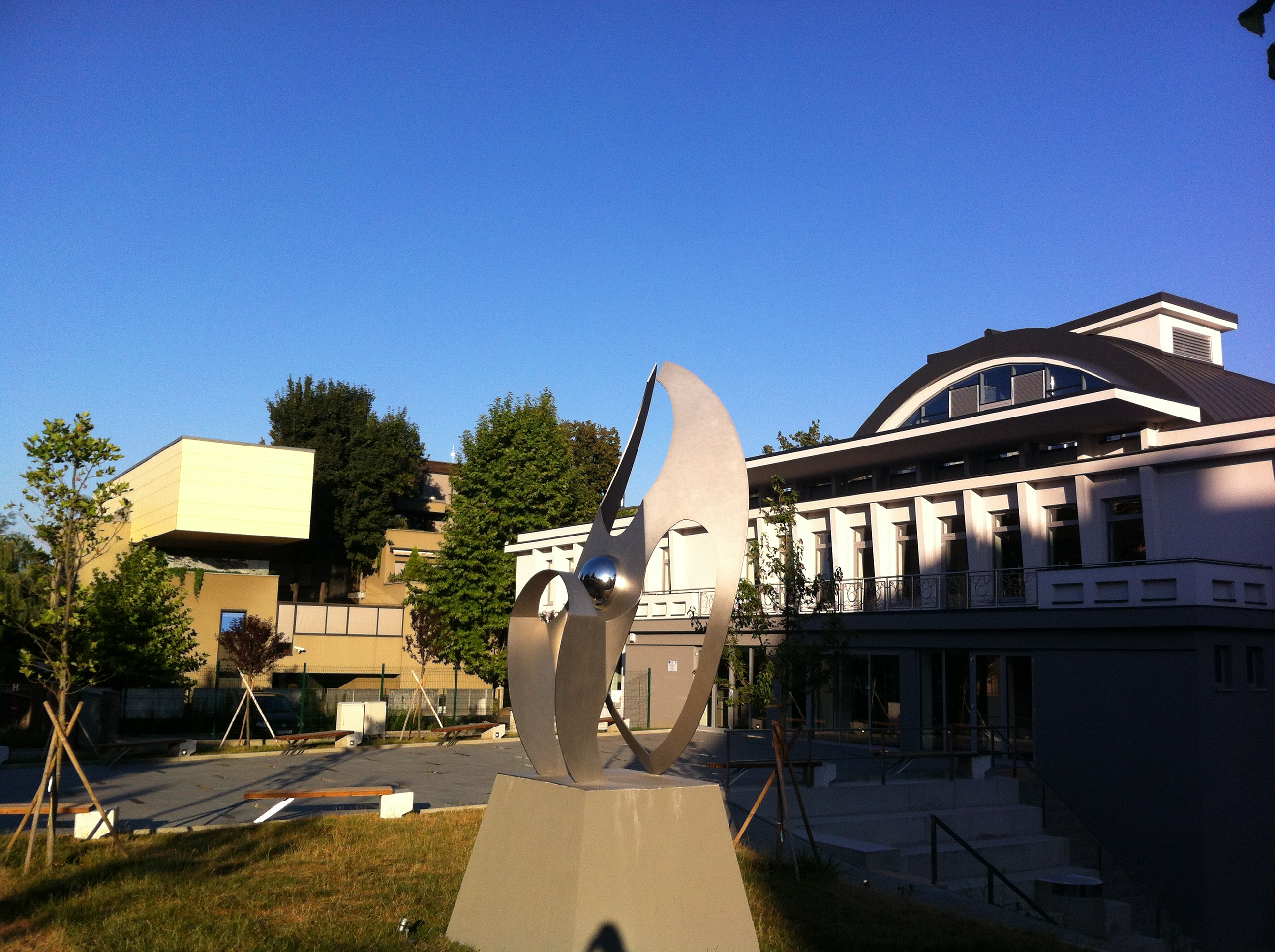
Kunsthalle

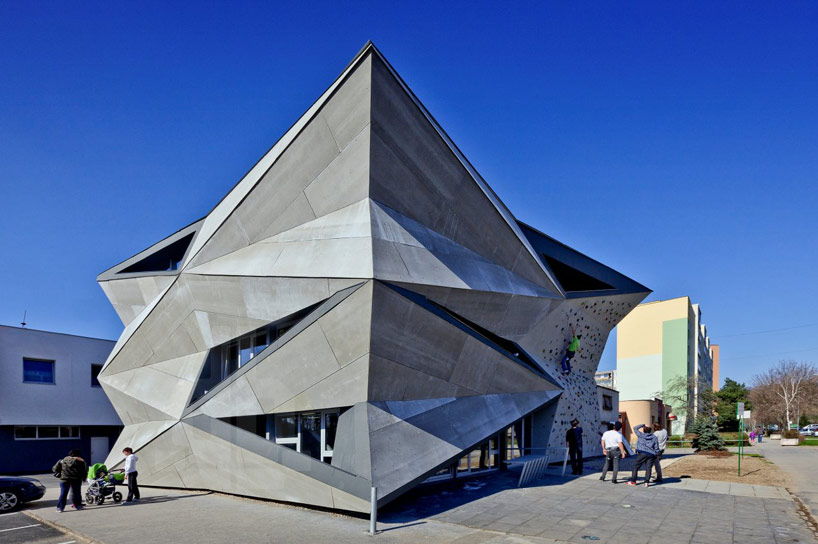
SPOT Važecká

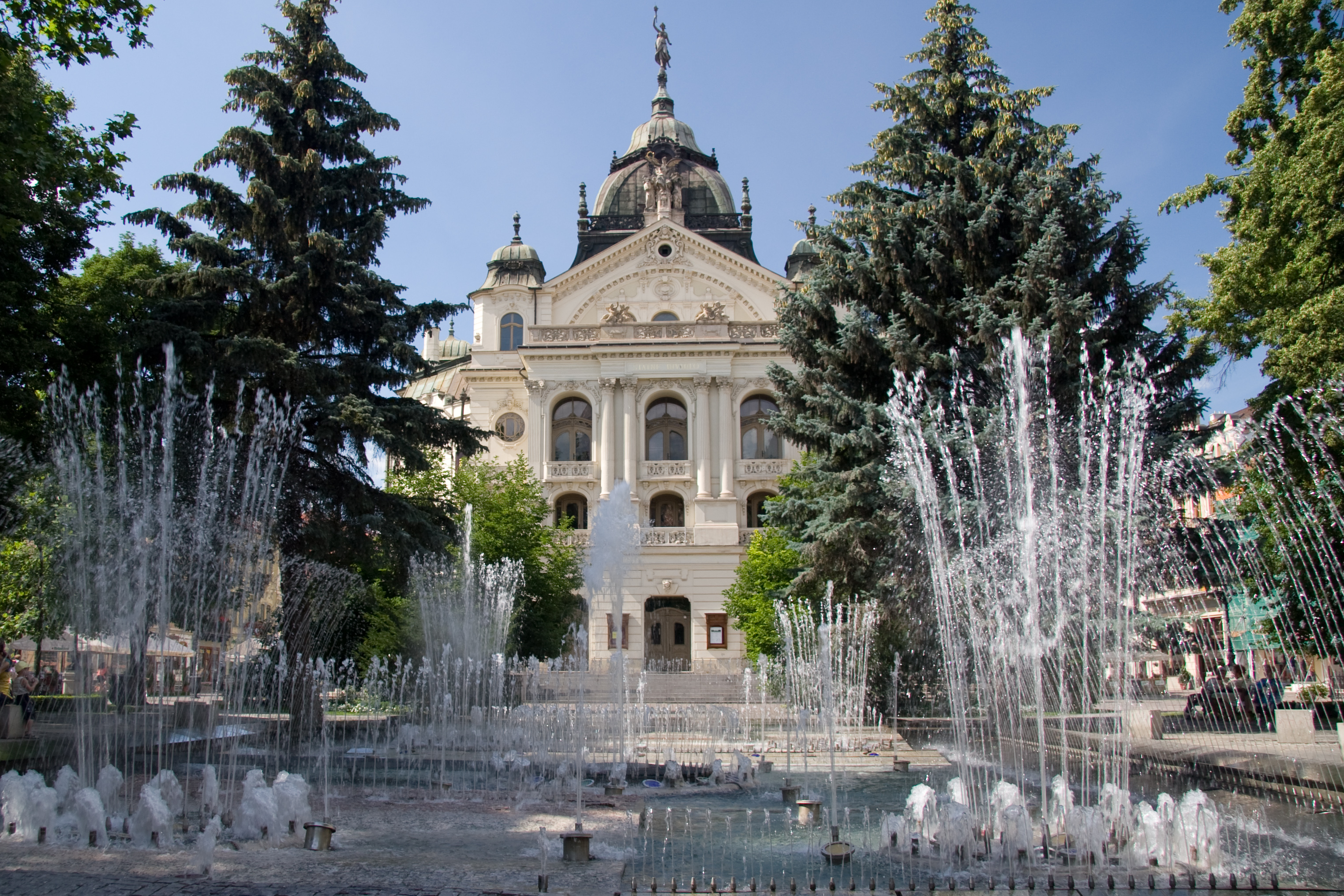
Košice State Theatre (Národné divadlo Košice)

=== Performing arts ===
There are several theatres in Košice. The Košice State Theater (Národné divadlo Košice) was founded in 1945 (then under the name East Slovak National Theater (Východoslovenské národné divadlo)). It consists of three ensembles: drama, opera, and ballet. Other theatres include the Marionette Theatre (Marionetové divadlo) and the Old Town Theatre (Staromestské divadlo). The presence of Hungarian and Roma minorities also makes it host the Hungarian Thália Theatre (Thália Színház) and the professional Roma Romathan Theatre (Divadlo Romathan).

Košice is the home of the State Philharmonic Košice (Štátna filharmónia Košice), established in 1968 as the second professional symphonic orchestra in Slovakia. It organizes festivals such as the Košice Music Spring Festival (Košická hudobná jar), the International Organ Music Festival (Medzinárodný organový festival), and the Festival of Contemporary art (Medzinárodný festival súčasného umenia).

=== Museums and galleries ===
Some of the museums and galleries based in the city include the East Slovak Museum (Východoslovenské múzeum), originally established in 1872 under the name Upper Hungary Museum (Felső-magyarországi Múzeum). The Slovak Technical Museum (Slovenské technické múzeum) with a planetarium, established in 1947, is the only museum in the technical category in Slovakia that specializes in the history and traditions of science and technology. The East Slovak Gallery (Východoslovenská galéria) was established in 1951 as the first regional gallery to document artistic life in present-day eastern Slovakia.

=== Film festival ===
The annual IFF Art Film, an international film festival, takes place in Košice in June each year.

=== European Capital of Culture ===
In 2008, Košice won the competition among Slovak cities to hold the prestigious title European Capital of Culture 2013. Project Interface aims at the transformation of Košice from a centre of heavy industry to a postindustrial city with creative potential and new cultural infrastructure. Project authors bring Košice a concept of the creative economy – merging of economy and industry with arts, where transformed urban space encourages development of certain fields of creative industry (design, media, architecture, music and film production, IT technologies, creative tourism). The artistic and cultural program stems from a conception of sustained, maintainable activities with long-lasting effects on cultural life in Košice and its region. The main project venues are:

- Kasárne Kulturpark (Barracks Cultural Park) – 19th-century military barracks turned into a new urban space with a centre of contemporary art, exhibition and concert halls, and workshops for the creative industry.
- Kunsthalle Košice – a 1960s disused swimming pool turned into the first Kunsthalle in Slovakia.
- SPOTs – the 1970s and 1980s disused heat exchangers turned into cultural "spots" in Communist era block-of-flats (paneláks) districts.
- City park, Park Komenského and Moyzesova – revitalisation of urban spaces.
- Castle of Košice, Amphitheater, Mansion of Krásna, Handicrafts Street – reconstruction.
- Tabačka – a 19th-century tobacco factory turned into a centre of independent culture. The Tabačka Kulturfabrik, DIG gallery, Kotolňa (Boiler room), and several artistic residents are located in the area of the former tobacco factory.

=== Media ===
The first and the oldest international festival of local TV broadcasters (founded in 1995) – The Golden Beggar (Zlatý žobrák), takes place every year in June in Košice.

The oldest evening newspaper is Košice's Evening (Košický večer). Other daily newspapers are Korzár, and, more recently, Košice:Today (Košice:Dnes).

TV stations based in Košice: TV Naša, TV Region and public TV broadcaster STVR Televízne štúdio Košice. TV JOJ was also stationed in Košice between 2 March and 27 September 2002.

Radio stations based in Košice: Rádio Košice, Dobré rádio, Rádio Kiss, Rádio Šport, and the public broadcaster RTVS Rádio Regina Košice.

== Economy ==
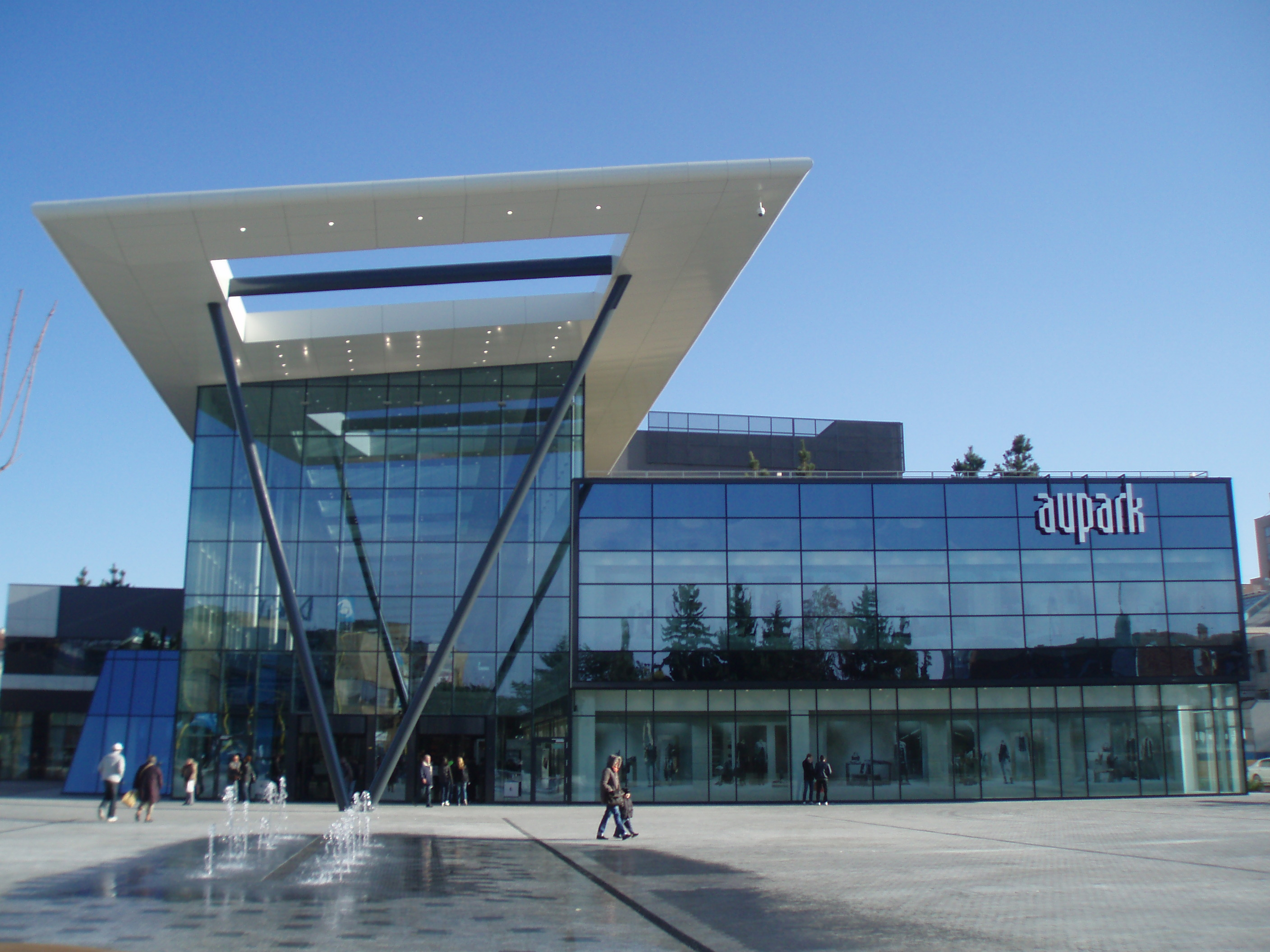
Aupark Shopping Centre

Košice is the economic hub of eastern Slovakia. It accounts for about 9% of the Slovak gross domestic product.

GDP per capita in 2001 was €4,004, which was below Slovakia's average of €4,400. The unemployment rate was 8.32% in November 2015, which was below the country's average 10.77% at that time. The city has a balanced budget of 224 million euros, as of 2019.

=== Steel production ===
The steel mill, U. S. Steel Košice with 13,500 employees, is the largest employer in the city and the largest private employer in the country.

=== IT sector ===
The second-largest employer in the east of the country is Deutsche Telekom IT Solutions Slovakia. It was established and has been based in Košice since 2006. Deutsche Telekom IT Solutions Slovakia had 4,545 employees in Košice in Q4 of 2020, which makes it the second-largest shared service center in Slovakia and one of the top fifteen largest employers in Slovakia.

As part of the growing ICT field, the Košice IT Valley association was established in 2007 as a joint initiative of educational institutions, government, and leading IT companies. In 2012, it was transformed into a cluster. In 2018, the cluster was for the second time certified for "Cluster Management Excellence Label GOLD" as the first in central Europe and is one of three certified clusters in the area of information and communication technologies.

=== Manufacturing ===
Volvo Cars has invested 1.2 billion euros (1.25 billion USD) in a new plant that started construction in 2023, for opening in 2026. In 2024, the European Commission approved state aid of €267 million from the Slovak government to support construction of the plant. In 2025, while the plant was still under construction, Volvo Cars announced the manufacturing start date to be delayed to 2027, with Polestar signing a memorandum of understanding with Volvo Cars to have the Polestar 7 manufactured in the new plant.

Other major sectors include mechanical engineering, food industry, services, and trade.

== Sights ==
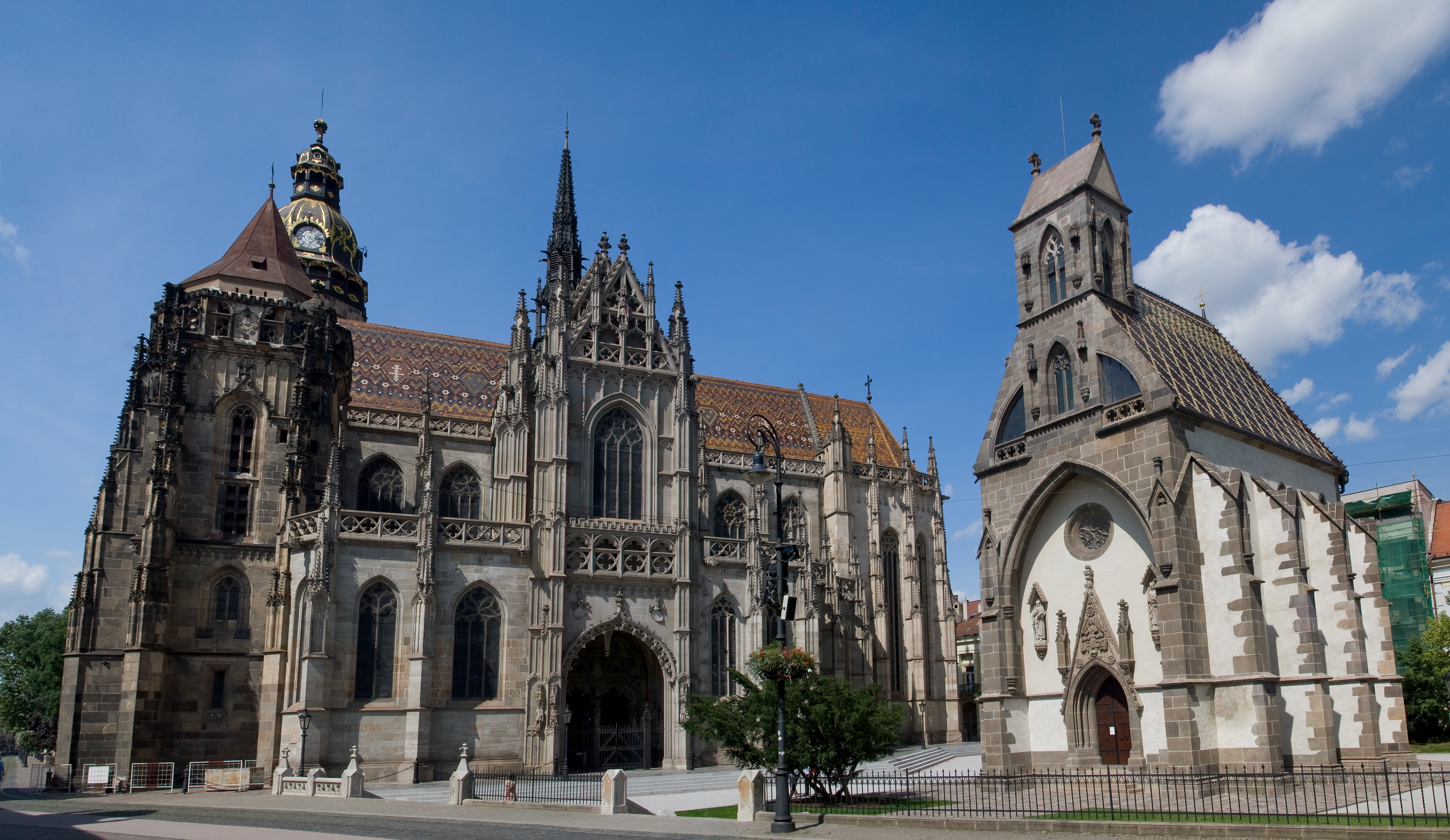
The Cathedral of St. Elizabeth in Košice is Slovakia's largest church.

The city centre, and most historical monuments, are located in or around Hlavná ulica (Main Street), and the town has the largest number of protected historical monuments in Slovakia.

The most dominant historical monument of the city is Slovakia's largest church, the 14th-century Gothic Cathedral of St. Elizabeth; it is the easternmost cathedral of western-style Gothic architecture in central Europe, and is the cathedral of the Archdiocese of Košice. In addition to the St. Elizabeth Cathedral, there is the 14th-century St. Michael Chapel, the St. Urban Tower, and the Neo-baroque Košice State Theater in the center of town.

The Executioner's Bastion and the Mill Bastion are the remains of the city's previous fortification system. The Church of the Virgin Mary's Birth is the cathedral for the Greek Catholic Eparchy of Košice. Other monuments and buildings of cultural and historical interest are: the old Town Hall, the Old University, the Captain's Palace, Liberation Square, as well as several galleries (the East Slovak Gallery) and museums (the East Slovak Museum). There is a Municipal Park located between the historical city centre and the main railway station. The city also has a zoo located northwest of the city, within the borough of Kavečany.

=== Places of worship ===
- Dóm svätej Alžbety (Cathedral of St. Elizabeth)
- Dominikánsky kostol (Dominican Church)
- Františkánsky kostol (Franciscan Church)
- Kostol svätého Ducha (Hospital Church of Holy Spirit)
- Morová kaplnka svätej Rozálie (Plague Chapel of St. Rosalie)
- Premonštrátny kostol (Premonstratensian Church), former Jesuit Church
- Kalvínsky kostol (Calvinist Church)
- Evanjelický kostol (Evangelical Church)
- Nová ortodoxná synagóga (New Orthodox Synagogue)

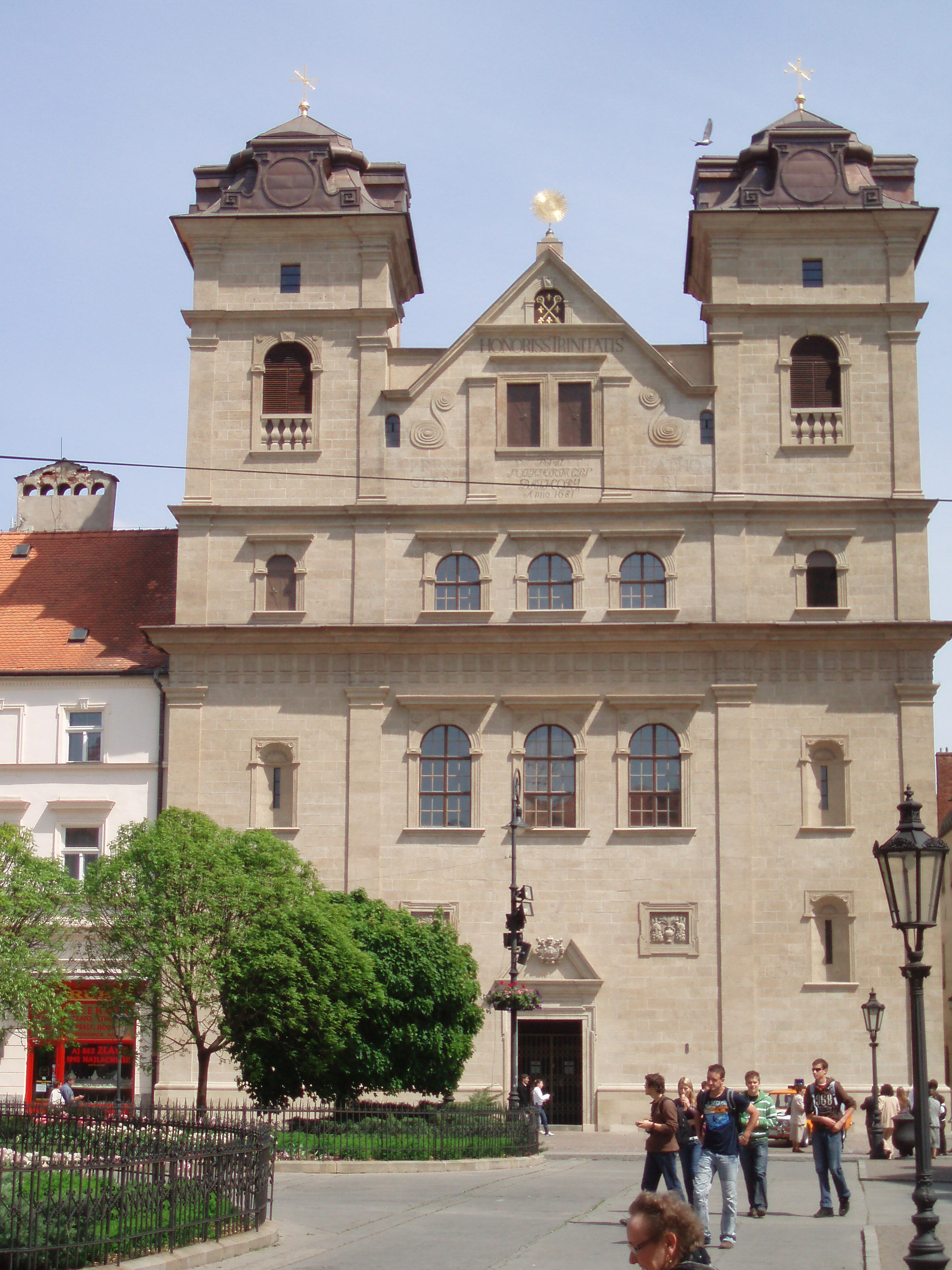
Late Renaissance, early Baroque Jesuits Church

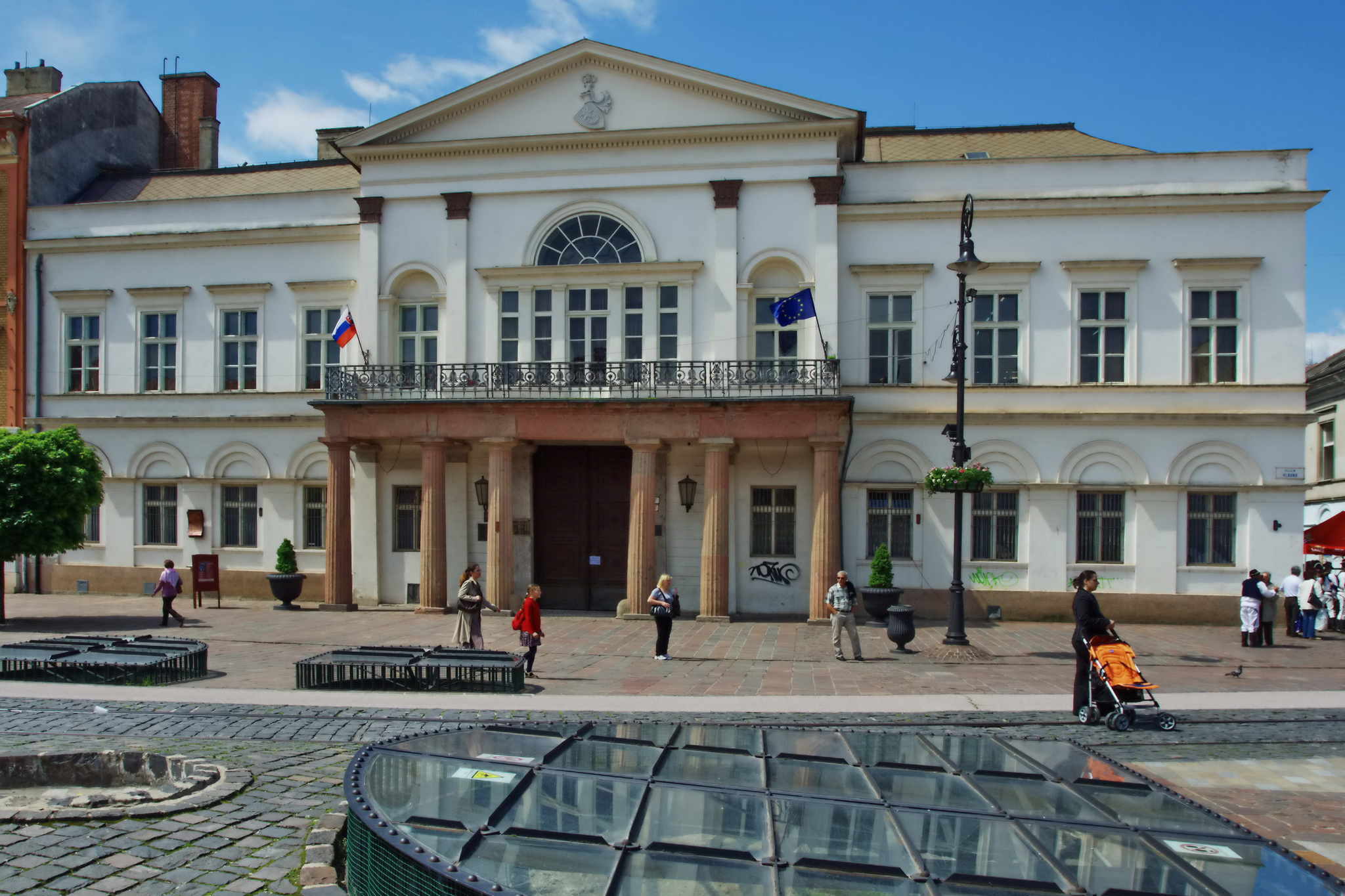
Empire style Pongrác-Forgács Palace (Pongrácovsko-forgáčovský palác)

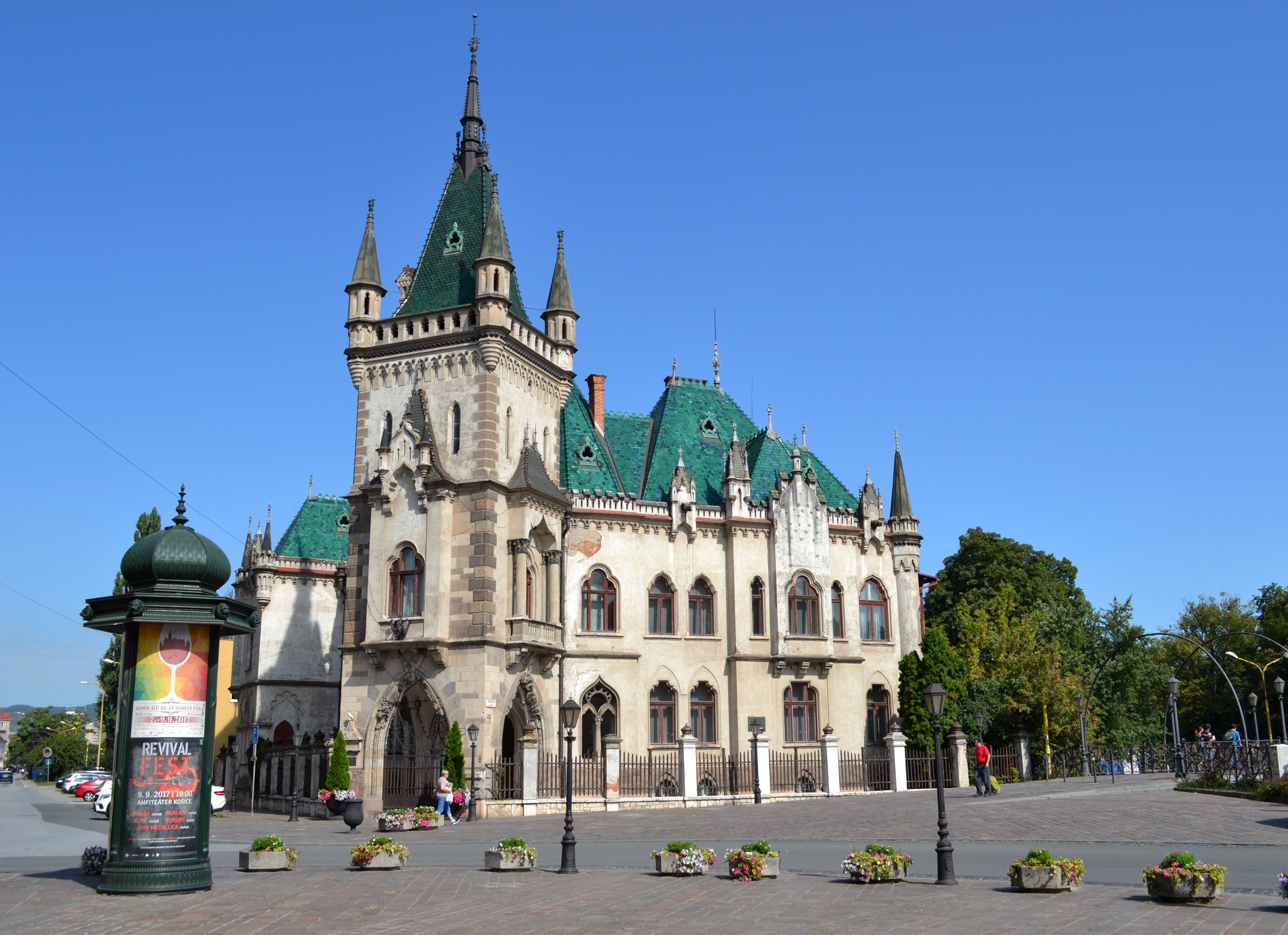
Historicism style Jakab's Palace (Jakabov palác)

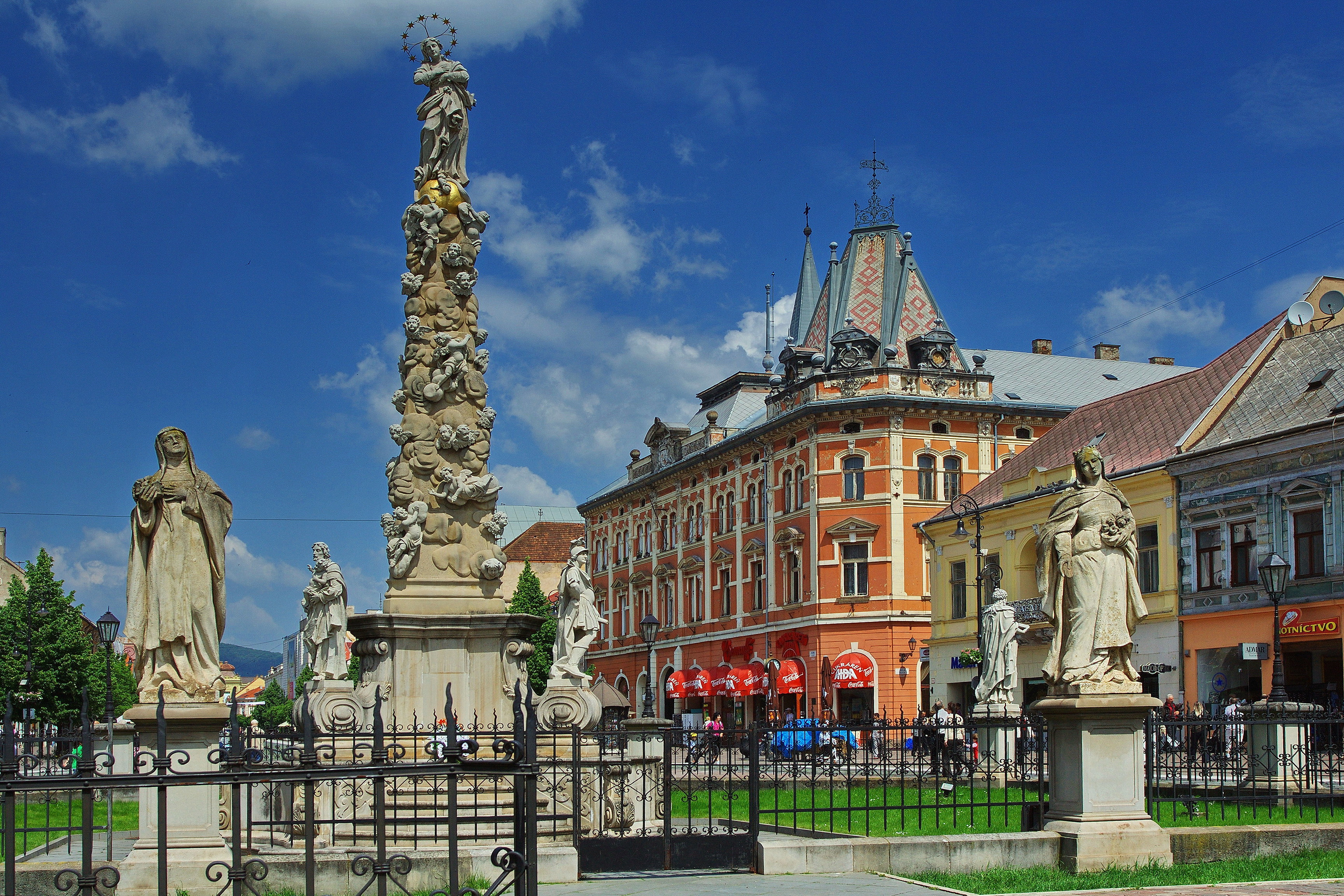
Neo-Renaissance Andrássy Palace (Andrášiho Palác)

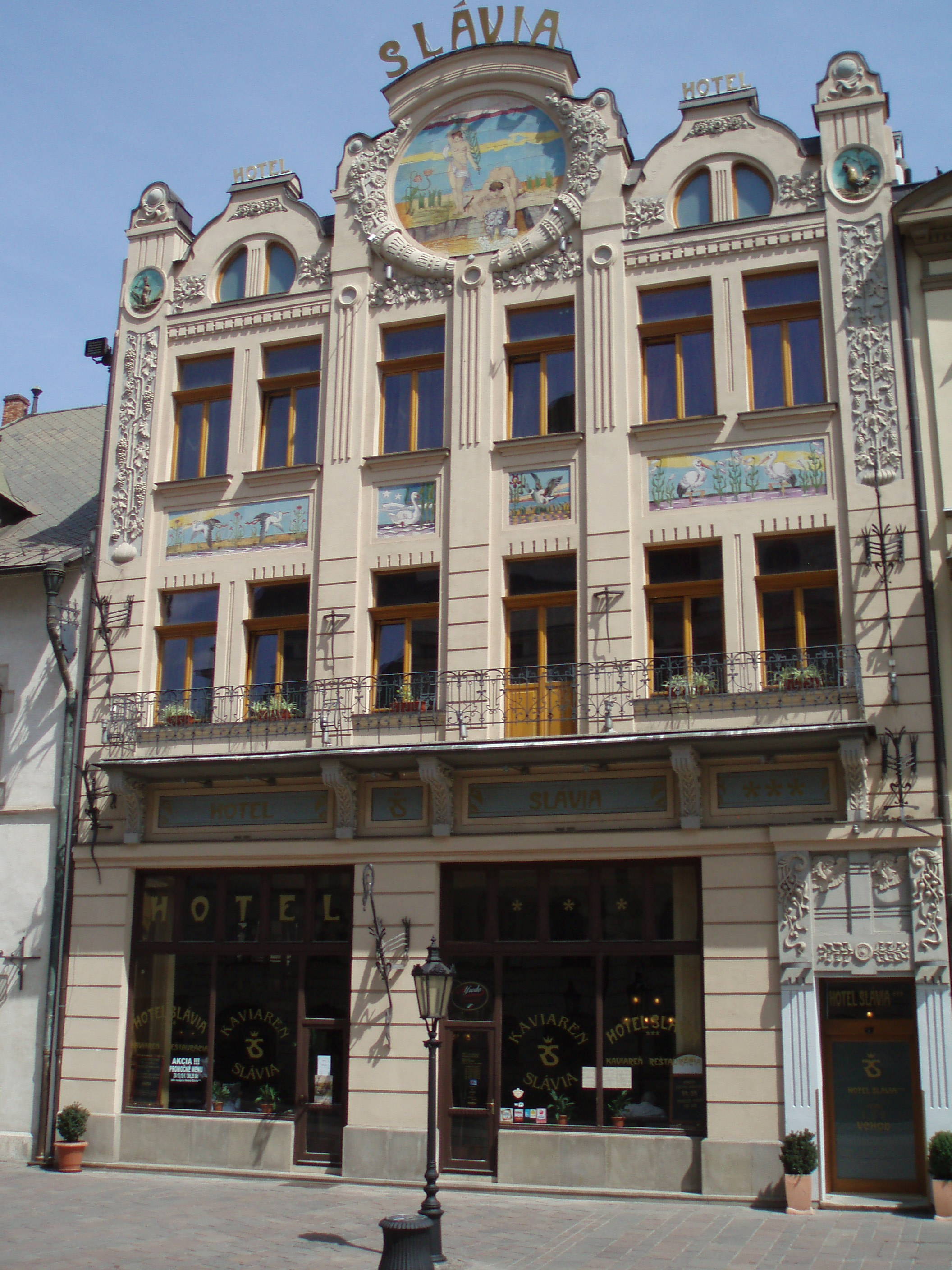
Art Nouveau style coffeehouse Slávia

== Government ==
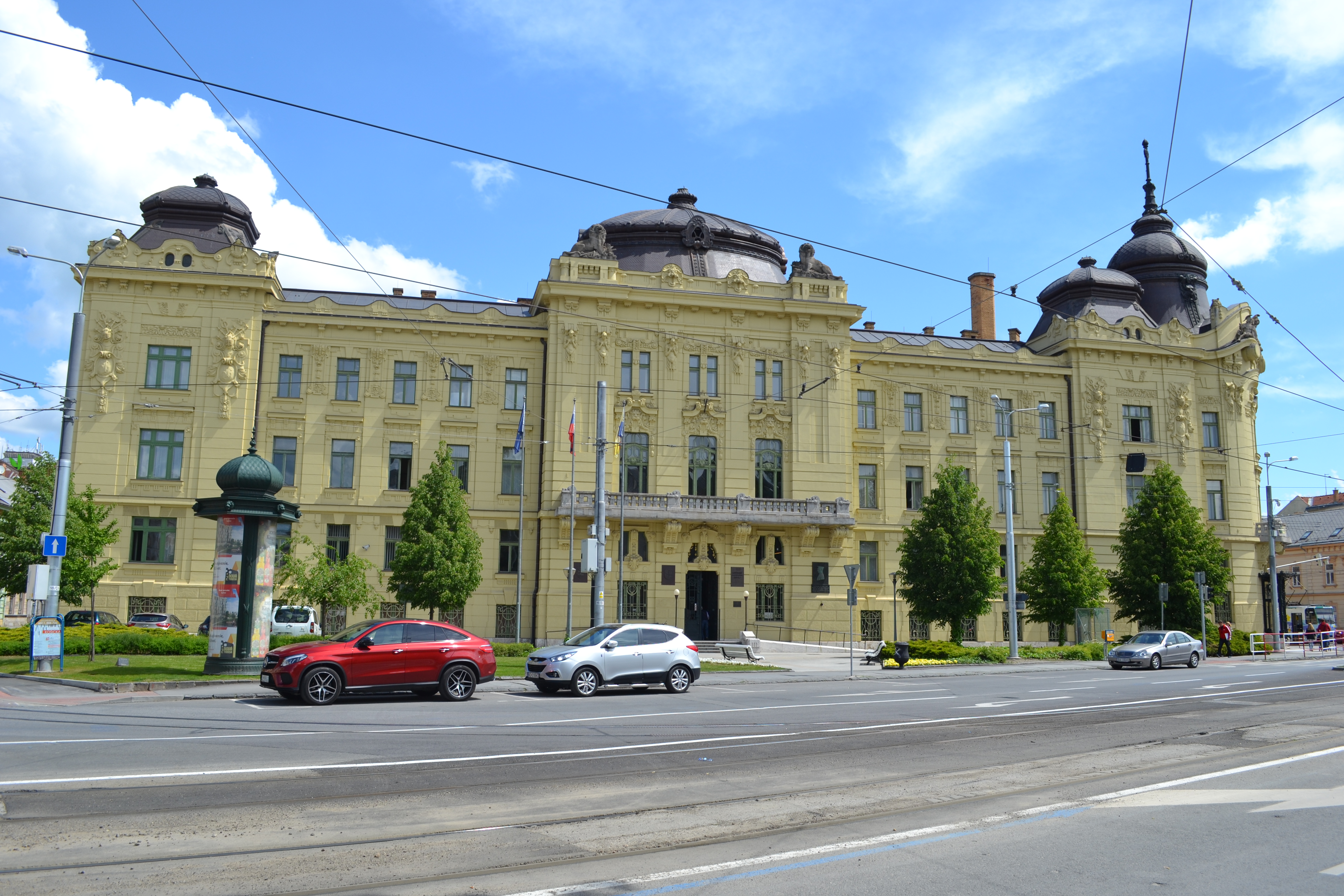
Divízia – seat of the Košice Self-governing Region

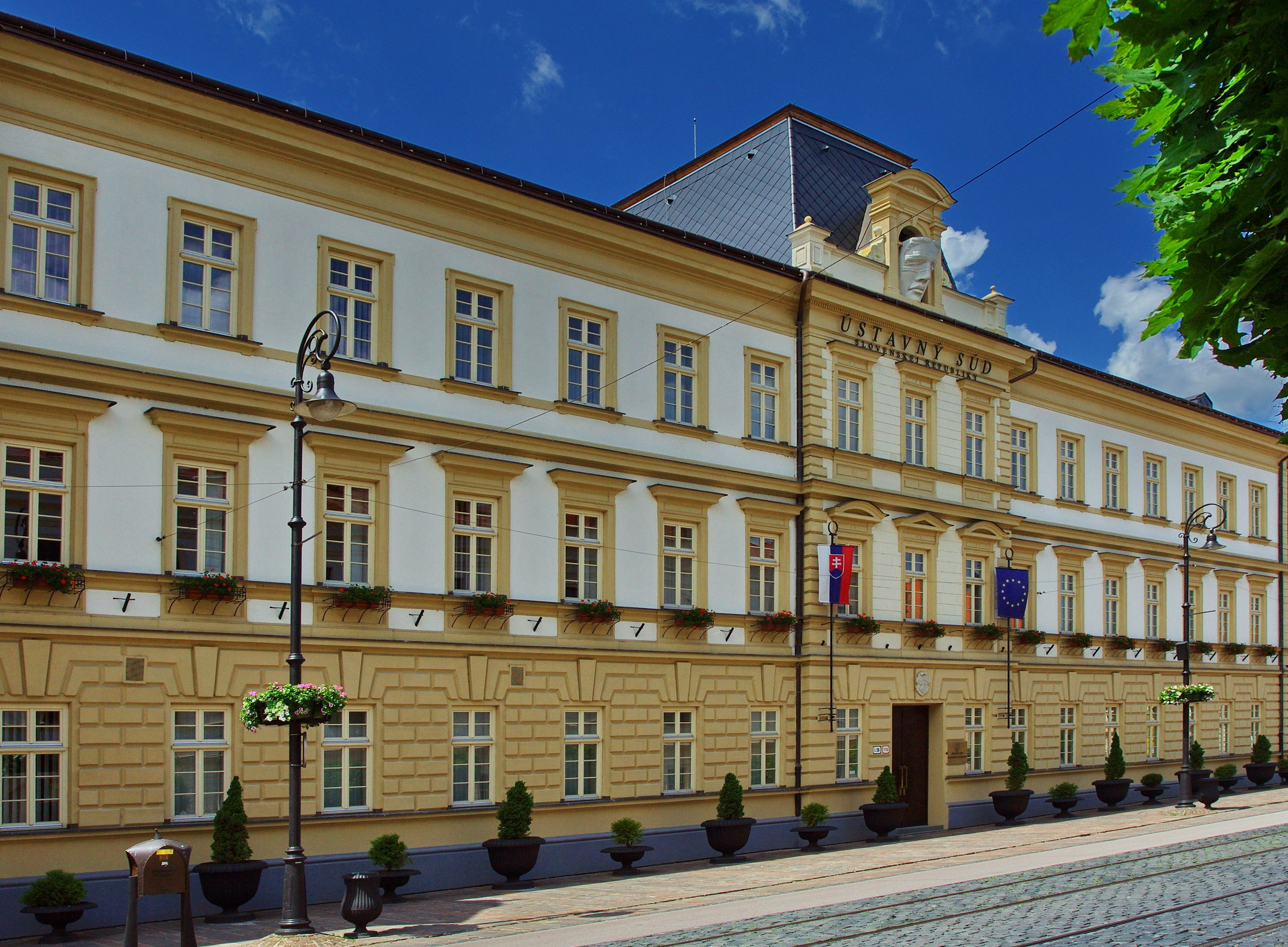
The seat of the Slovak Constitutional Court

Košice is the seat of the Košice Region (Slovak: Košický kraj), and since 2002 it is the seat of the autonomous Košice Self-governing Region (Slovak: Košický samosprávný kraj). Additionally, it is the seat of the Slovak Constitutional Court (Ústavný súd Slovenskej republiky). The city hosts a regional branch of the National Bank of Slovakia (Národná banka Slovenska) and consulates of Belgium, Greece, Hungary, Russia, Spain and Turkey.

The local government is composed of a mayor (primátor), a city council (mestské zastupiteľstvo), a city board (mestská rada), city commissions (komisie mestského zastupiteľstva), and a city magistrate's office (magistrát). The directly elected mayor is the head and chief executive of the city. The term of office is four years. The previous mayor, František Knapík, was nominated in 2006 by a coalition of four political parties KDH, SMK, and SDKÚ-DS. In 2010, he finished his term of office. The present mayor is Ing. Jaroslav Polaček. He was inaugurated on 10 December 2018.

In 2021, the municipality recycled 24.64% of its municipal waste.

Administratively, the city of Košice is divided into four districts: Košice I (covering the center and northern parts), Košice II (covering the southwest), Košice III (east), and Košice IV (south), which are further divided into 22 boroughs (city wards):

Administrative division of Košice
District	Boroughs
Košice I	Džungľa, Kavečany, Sever, Sídlisko Ťahanovce, Staré Mesto, Ťahanovce
Košice II	Lorinčík, Luník IX, Myslava, Pereš, Poľov, Sídlisko KVP, Šaca, Západ
Košice III	Dargovských hrdinov, Košická Nová Ves
Košice IV	Barca, Juh, Krásna, Nad jazerom, Šebastovce, Vyšné Opátske

== Education ==
Košice is the second university town in Slovakia, after Bratislava. The Technical University of Košice is its largest university, with 16,015 students, including 867 doctoral students. A second major university is the Pavol Jozef Šafárik University, with 7,403 students, including 527 doctoral students. Other universities and colleges include the University of Veterinary Medicine in Košice (1,381 students), and the private Security Management College in Košice (1,168 students). Additionally, the University of Economics in Bratislava, the Slovak University of Agriculture in Nitra, and the Catholic University in Ružomberok each have a branch based in the city.

There are 38 public elementary schools, six private elementary schools, three religious elementary schools, and one International Baccalaureate (IB) Primary Years Programme (PYP) candidate international school. Overall, they enroll 20,158 pupils. The city's system of secondary education (some middle schools and all high schools) consists of 20 gymnasia with 7,692 students, 24 specialized high schools with 8,812 students, and 13 Vocational schools with 6,616 students.

Kosice International School (KEIS) is the first international primary school in eastern Slovakia. It will be an International Baccalaureate (IB) Primary Years Programme (PYP) international school. Opening in September 2020.

== Transport ==
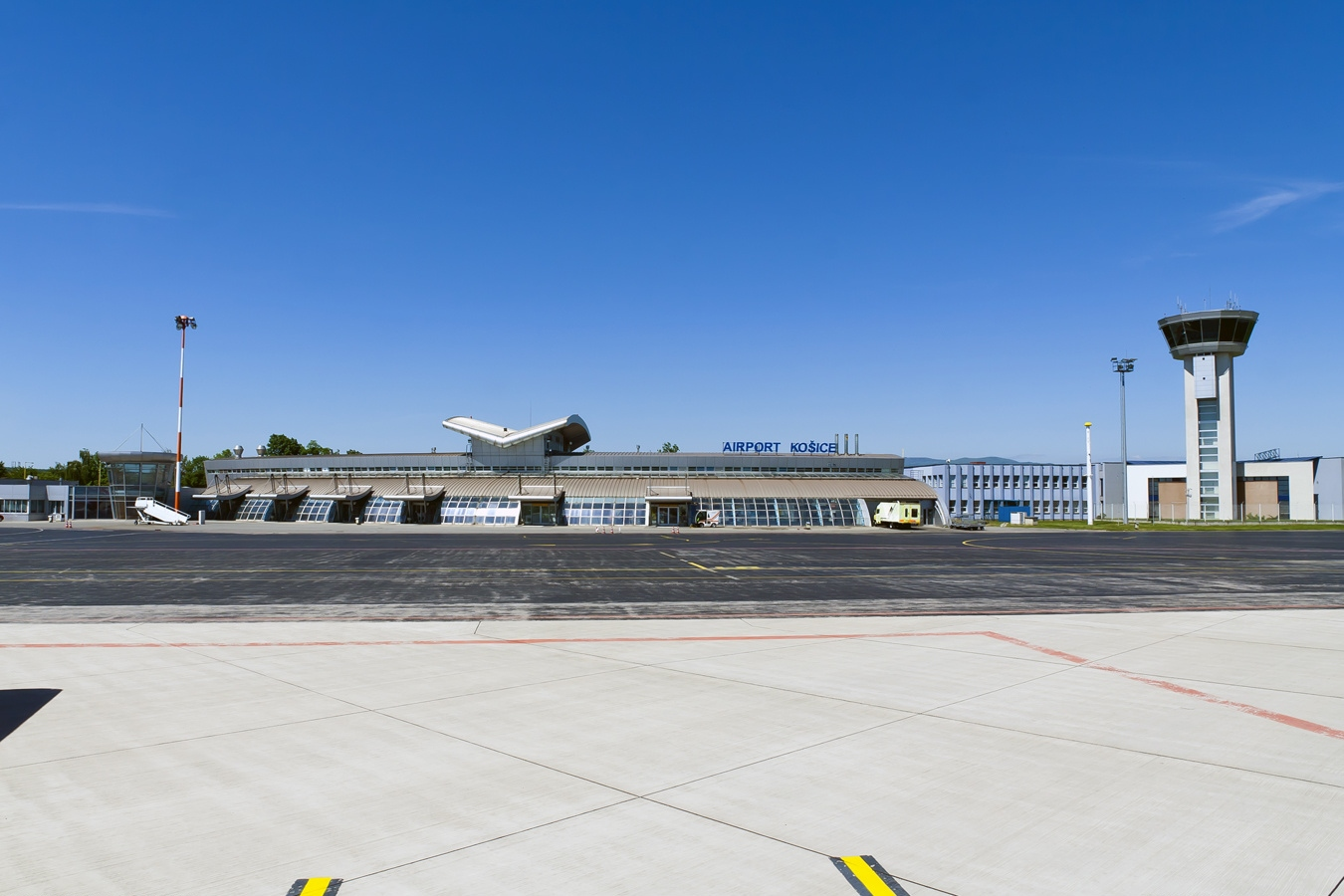
Košice International Airport

Public transport in Košice is managed by the Public Transport Company of the City of Košice (Dopravný podnik mesta Košice). The municipal mass transit system is the oldest one in present-day Slovakia, with the first horse-car line beginning operation in 1891 (electrified in 1914). Today, the city's public transportation system is composed of buses (in use since the 1950s), trams, and trolleybuses (1993–2014).

The Košice railway station (Železničná stanica Košice) is a rail hub of eastern Slovakia. The city is connected by rail to Prague, Bratislava, Prešov, Čierna nad Tisou, Humenné, Miskolc (Hungary), and Zvolen. There is a broad gauge track from Ukraine, leading to the steel mill southwest of the city. The D1 motorway connects the city to Prešov, and more motorways and roads are planned around the city.

Košice International Airport (Medzinárodné letisko Košice) is located south of the city. Regular direct flights from the airport are available to London Luton and Stansted (from April 2020), Vienna, Warsaw, Düsseldorf, and Prague. Regular flights are provided by Austrian Airlines, Eurowings, LOT Polish Airlines and Wizz Air, and in code-share by Lufthansa. At its peak in the year 2008, it served 590,919 passengers, but the number has since declined.

== Sports ==
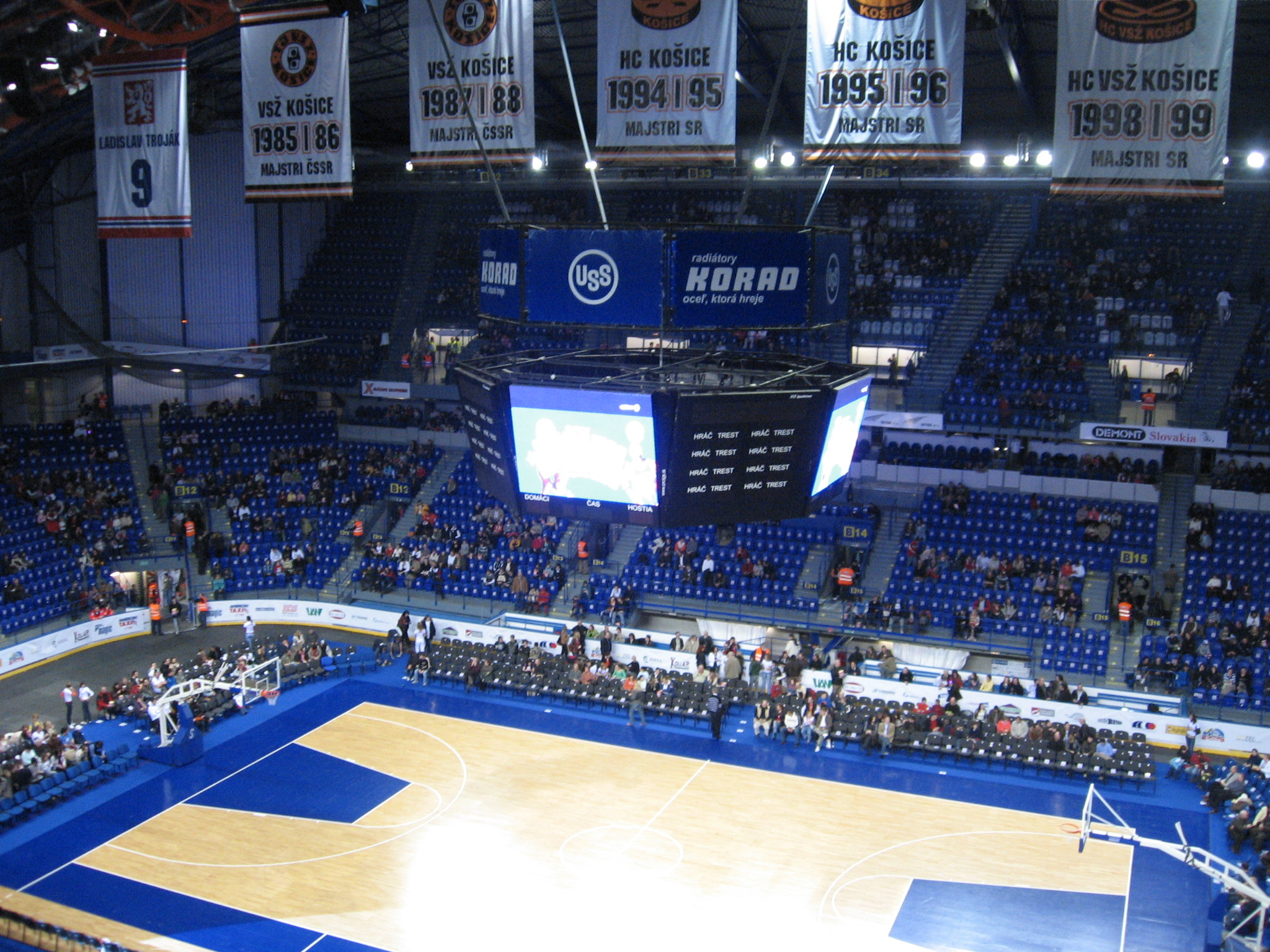
Steel Arena

The Košice Peace Marathon (Košický maratón mieru), founded in 1924, is the oldest annual marathon in Europe and the third oldest in the entire world, after the Boston Marathon and the Yonkers Marathon. It is run in the historic part of the city and is organized every year on the first Sunday of October.

Ice hockey club HC Košice is one of the most successful Slovak hockey clubs. It plays in Slovakia's highest league, the Extraliga, and has won eight titles in 1995, 1996, 1999, 2009, 2010, 2011, 2014, and 2015; and two titles (1986 and 1988) in the former Czechoslovak Extraliga. Since 2006, their home has been the Steel Arena, which has a capacity of 8,343 spectators. Košice was once home to football club MFK Košice until it folded due to bankruptcy. It was the first club from Slovakia to reach the group stages of the UEFA Champions League and won the domestic league twice (1998 and 1999). Another football club, FC VSS Košice, last played in the 2. Liga (2nd League) in the 2016–17 season, with a new home stadium known as the Košice Football Arena (Košická futbalová Arena (KFA)). It merged with FK Košice-Barca in 2018 to become FC Košice. FC Košice currently plays in the First Football League. Other clubs from the city include Slávia TU Košice, which plays in the second tier, and FC Lokomotíva Košice, which plays in the third tier. Kassai VSC is a fecunct football club that played in the Hungarian league system between 1941 and 1944.

Košice, along with Bratislava, hosted the 2011 and 2019 IIHF World Championship in ice hockey.

Košice became the 2016 European City of Sport by the European Capitals of Sports Association (ACES Europe). The sporting events in 2016 included the International Peace Marathon (Medzinárodný maratón mieru or Košický maratón mieru), several urban runs, a swimming relay contest, the Košice-Tatry-Košice cycling race, the dancesport world championships, the Basketball Euroleague, Volleyball World League, and Water Polo World League.

== In film ==
Filming for the 2025 film Slovak-Austrian film Perla took place in the city.

== Twin towns – sister cities ==
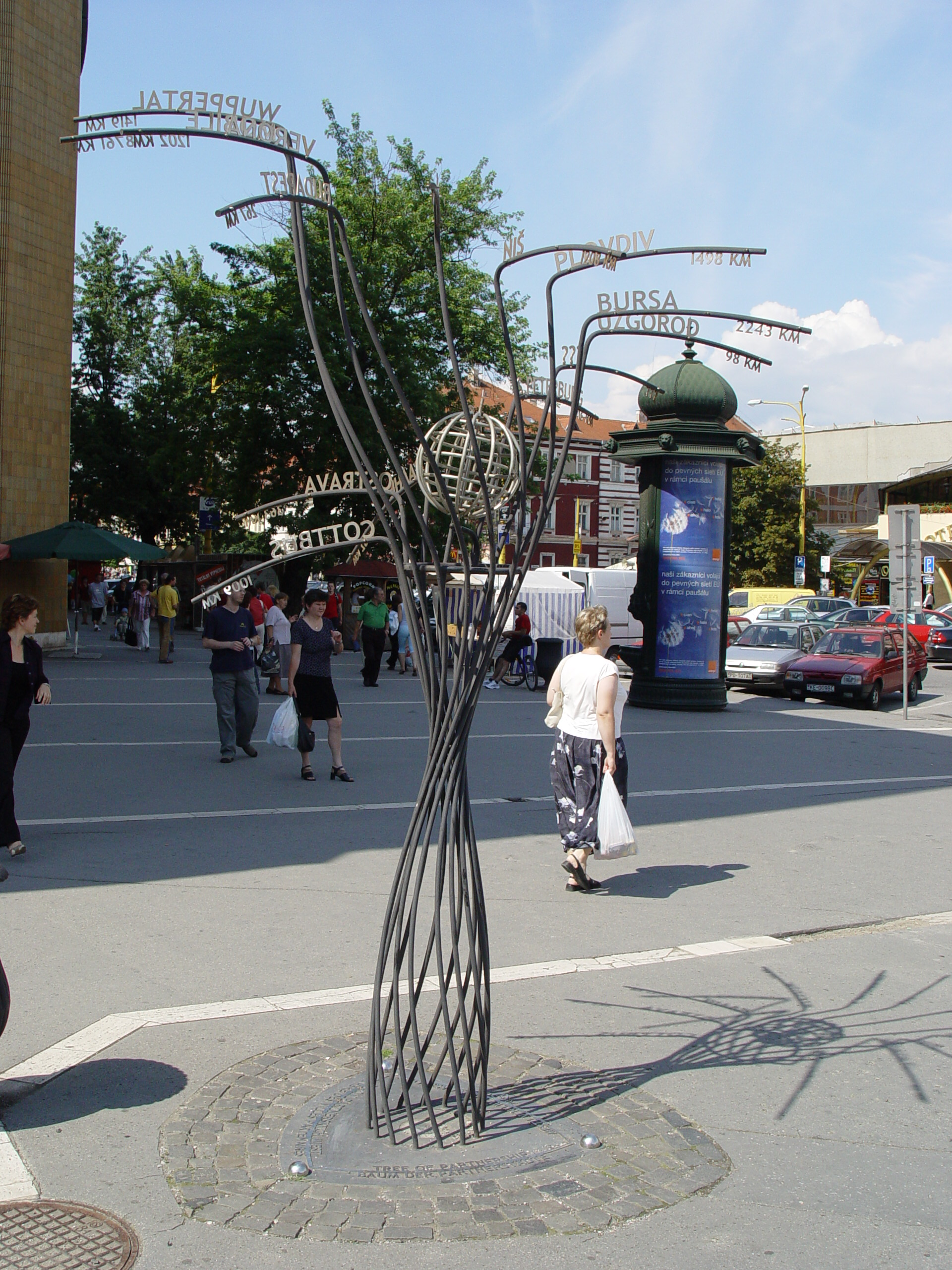
The Tree of Partnership on Main Street (Hlavná ulica)

Košice is twinned with:

- Abaújszántó, Hungary (2007)
- Budapest, Hungary (1997)
- Bursa, Turkey (2000)
- Cottbus, Germany (1992)
- Da Nang, Vietnam (2015)
- Ho Chi Minh City, Vietnam (2016)
- Katowice, Poland (1991)
- Krosno, Poland (1991)
- Miskolc, Hungary (1997)
- Mobile, United States (2000)
- Niš, Serbia (2000)
- Ostrava, Czech Republic (2001)
- Plovdiv, Bulgaria (2000)
- Raahe, Finland (1987)
- Rzeszów, Poland (1991)
- Uzhhorod, Ukraine (1993)
- Vysoké Tatry, Slovakia (2006)
- Wuhan, China (2012)
- Wuppertal, Germany (1980)

=== Former twin cities ===
As a result of the 2022 Russian invasion of Ukraine, the City Council had terminated cooperation with the following cities:

- Vitebsk, Belarus (2015)
- Saint Petersburg, Russia (1995)

== See also ==
- List of municipalities and towns in Slovakia
- Zlaty dukat
