= Košický večer =

Košický večer (English: Košice's Evening) was a city evening paper in Košice, Slovakia. It was founded in 1969, making it the oldest evening paper in Slovakia.

== History and profile ==
The newspaper was established in 1969 under the name Večer. In 1990 it was renamed as Košický večer. The paper was issued daily from Monday to Friday with a weekend supplement in Friday's issue until 2004 when it began to be published by the Petit Press and printed weekly on Fridays.
