= Evangelical Church of Košice =

Church in Košice, Slovakia

Coordinates: 48.721267°N 21.260980°E

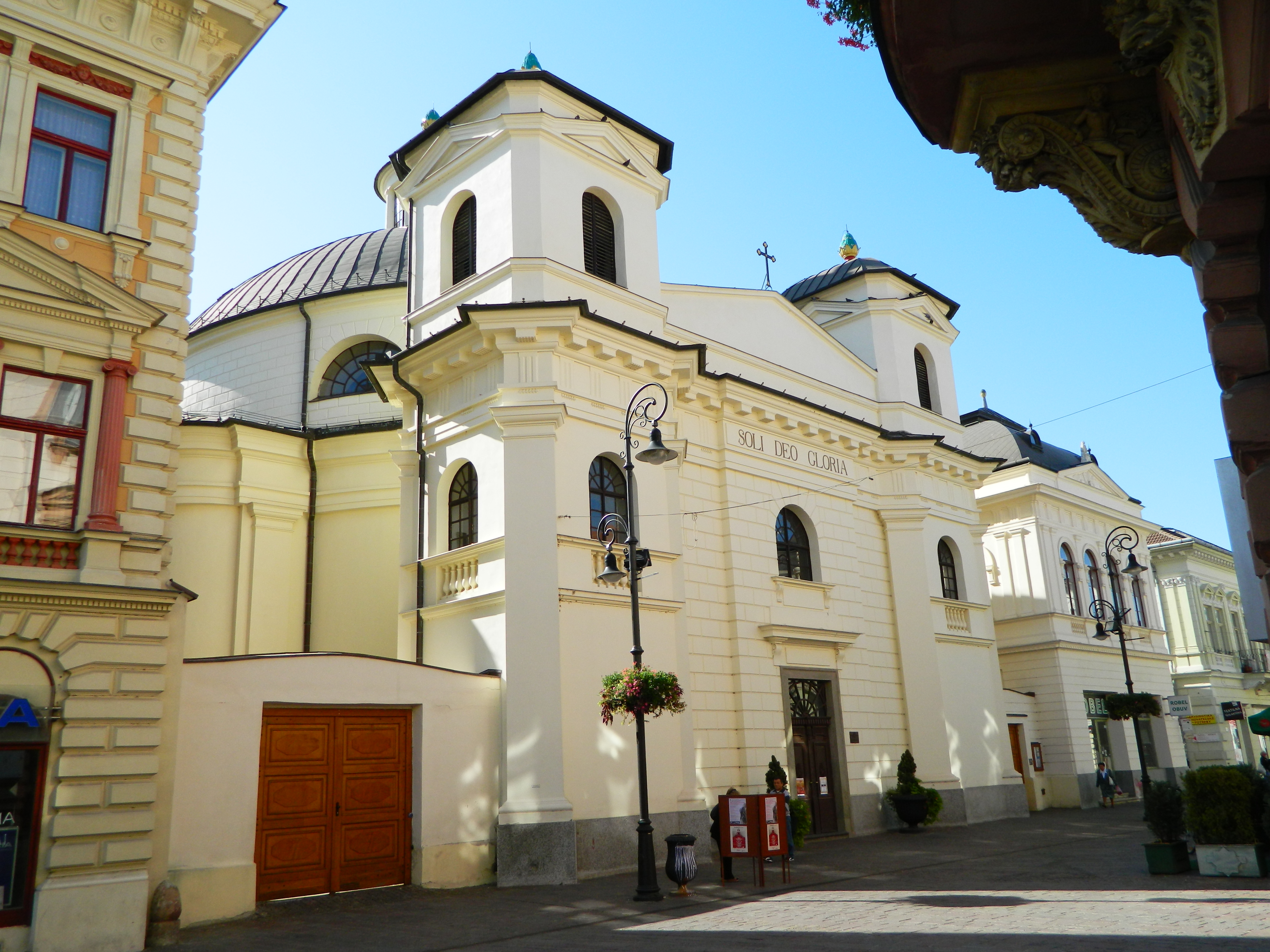
The Evangelical Church

The Evangelical Church or Protestant Church (Slovak: Evanjelický kostol) in Mlynská ulica (Mill Street) in Košice, Slovakia is a Neoclassical church building of the Evangelical Church of the Augsburg Confession in Slovakia, a Lutheran denomination. It has Sunday services at 09:30 and 18:00 in Slovak, and at 08:15 in Hungarian.

== History ==
It was built in 1816 based on the design of Georg Kitzling, a court architect from Vienna, for the German and Slovak Protestants of the town of Košice. During the construction of the church, Hungarian Protestants joined German and Slovak and bought the bells. The cross from old wooden church made in 1735 was transferred into the new church.

The Evangelical church in Košice is an oval central church building. Typical Lutheran chancels are situated in side spaces. The cupola with a panel ceiling is notable as is the main altar with its column architecture. The church is joined by the rectory and the choir house.

== See also ==
- Košice
