= Hlavná ulica =

Central street of Košice, Slovakia

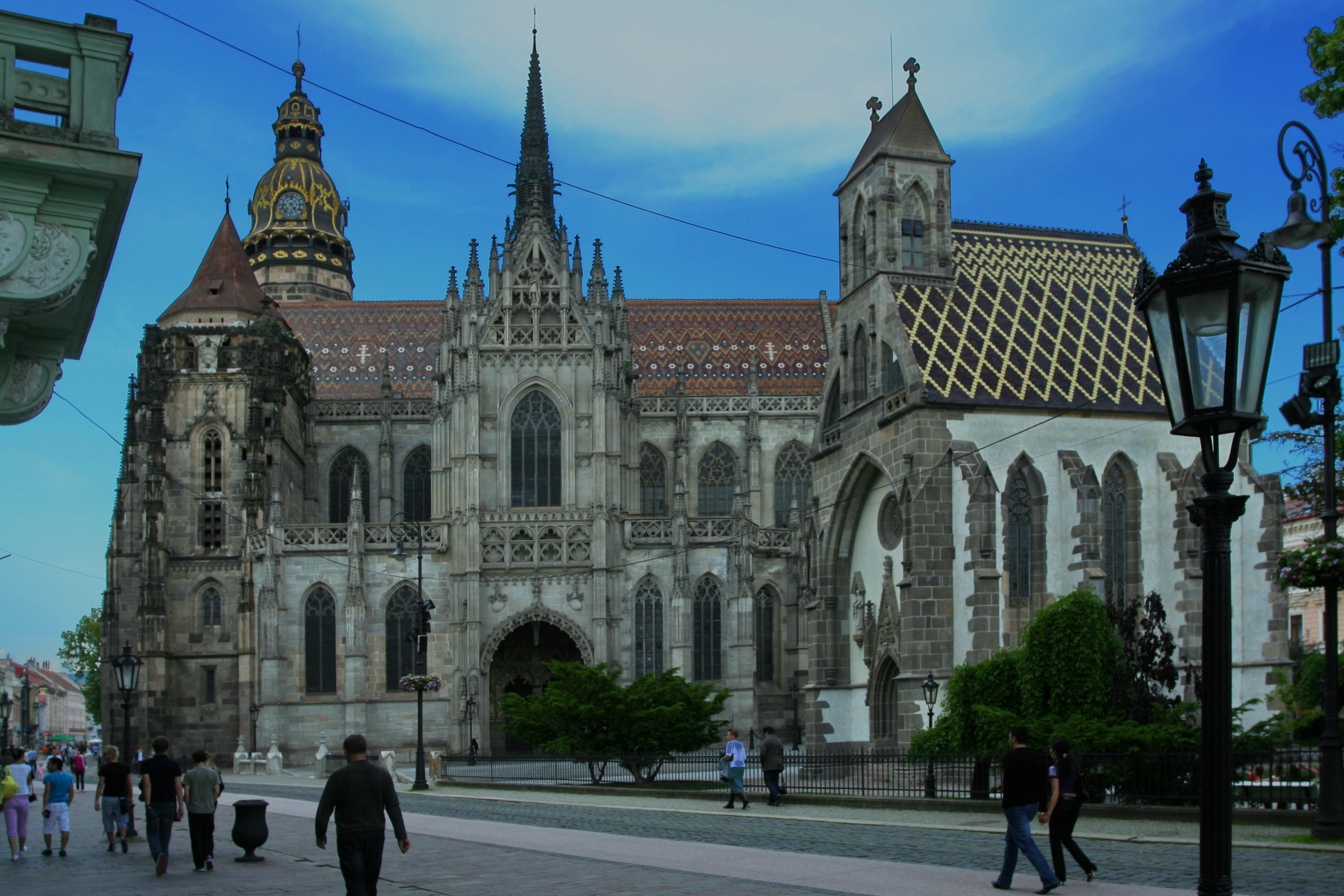
- Type: Street/square
- Length: 1,200 m (3,900 ft)
- Location: Old Town, Košice, Slovakia
- Coordinates: 48.722089°N 21.257576°E

Hlavná ulica (English: Main Street) is the central street of Košice, Slovakia. Most important historical monuments of Košice are located on it. The southern end of the street ends at Liberators Square, the northern end at Marathon Peace Square.

Almost the entire Main Street is a pedestrian zone. There are three parks, each with a fountain. The largest is the so-called singing fountain, which can be found in the middle of the street between the cathedral of St. Elizabeth and the National Theatre. There are also two squares on the street – the Main Square and the Freedom Square. The main street was originally a medieval square. Its spindle-shaped plan has been preserved from those times.

== History ==
During the Middle Ages, the name of the street was variable, the most frequently mentioned names were Circulus, Ring, Theatrum, which proves that the street was understood as a square at that time. Maps from the 18th century show the name Platea principalis and later German and Hungarian equivalents in the form of Haupt Gasse and Fő utcza.

After Košice came under the territorial sovereignty of Czechoslovakia, the original Hungarian name Fő utcza was translated into Slovak as Hlavná ulica (Main Street). It lasted until 1933, when the street was politically renamed for the first time – after General Milan Rastislav Štefánik, to whom a statue was erected on this street. During the Horthy occupation, the name of the street was temporarily reverted to its original Hungarian name, but after the war the street briefly bore Štefánik's name again.

In the summer of 1949, the current Main Street was renamed Lenin Street by the communist authorities, a name that lasted exactly to the day for 41 years. On 1 July 1990, the street was restored to its historic medieval name, Hlavnaya. However, in the late 1980s, during the preparations for the declaration of the historical centre of Košice as an urban conservation area, the conservationist Ivan Gojdič, a relative of Bishop Pavel Petr Gojdič, proposed changing the name of the street to a compromise in the form of Vladimir Ilyich Lenin's Main Street. However, this attempt was firmly rejected by the Communist authorities. The attempt was not accepted by the Communist authorities.

The street became first large-scale pedestrian area in the whole Czechoslovakia in 1984. Mayor Rudolf Schuster took inspiration from German city of Wuppertal, and this model would serve as an example that many Slovak and Czech cities would follow since then.

== Monuments and important buildings ==
- Cathedral of St. Elizabeth
- St Michael Chapel
- St Anthony of Padua Church
- St. Urban Tower
- National Theatre Košice
- Plague Column
- Archbishop's Palace
- County House
- Church of the Holy Trinity
- Andrássy Palace
- Hadik-Barkóci Palace
- Čáki-Dezőfi Palace
- Slávia Hotel and Café

== Gallery ==
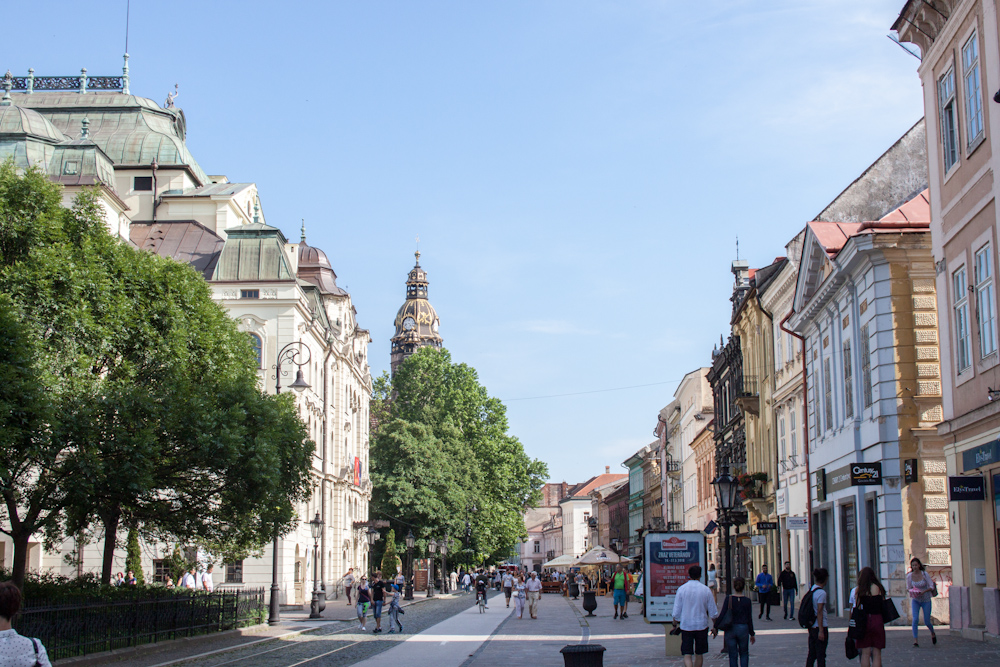
Main Street in Kosice

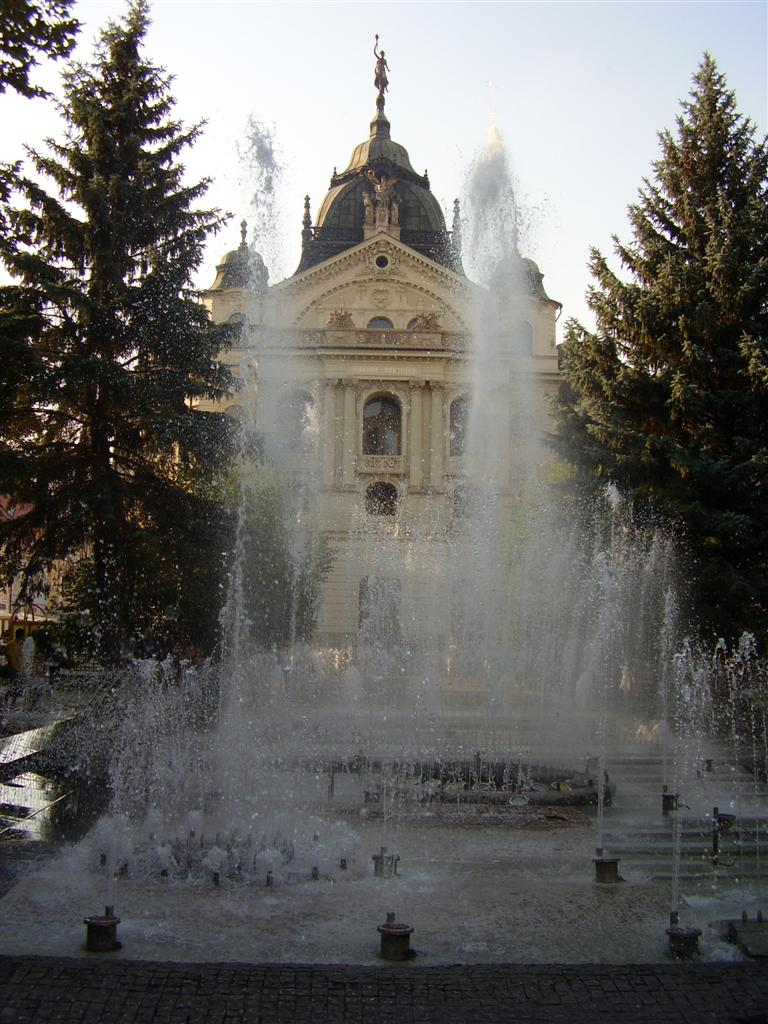
Fountain on the Main street in Košice

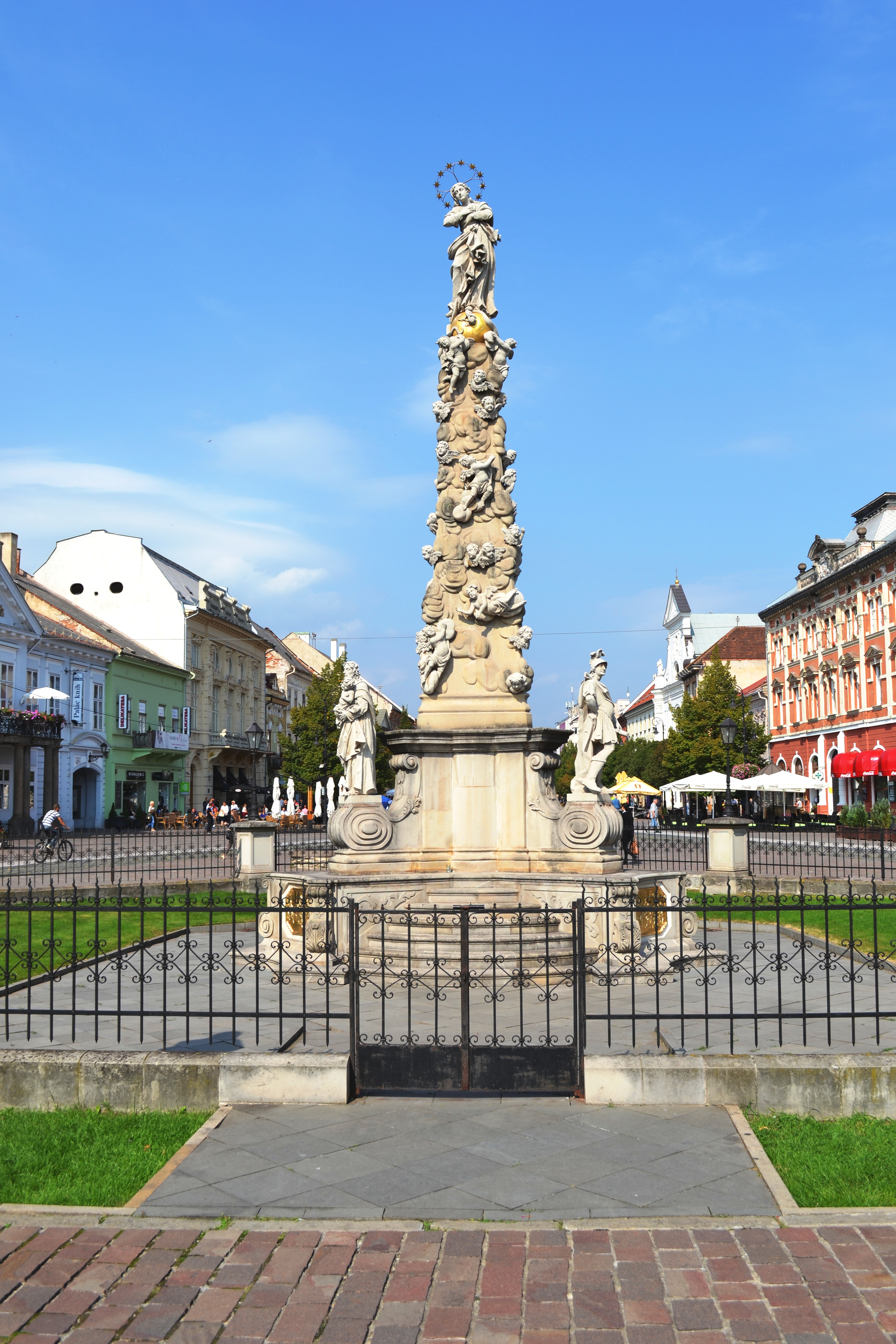
Plague Column of the Virgin Mary in Košice, built between 1720 and 1723

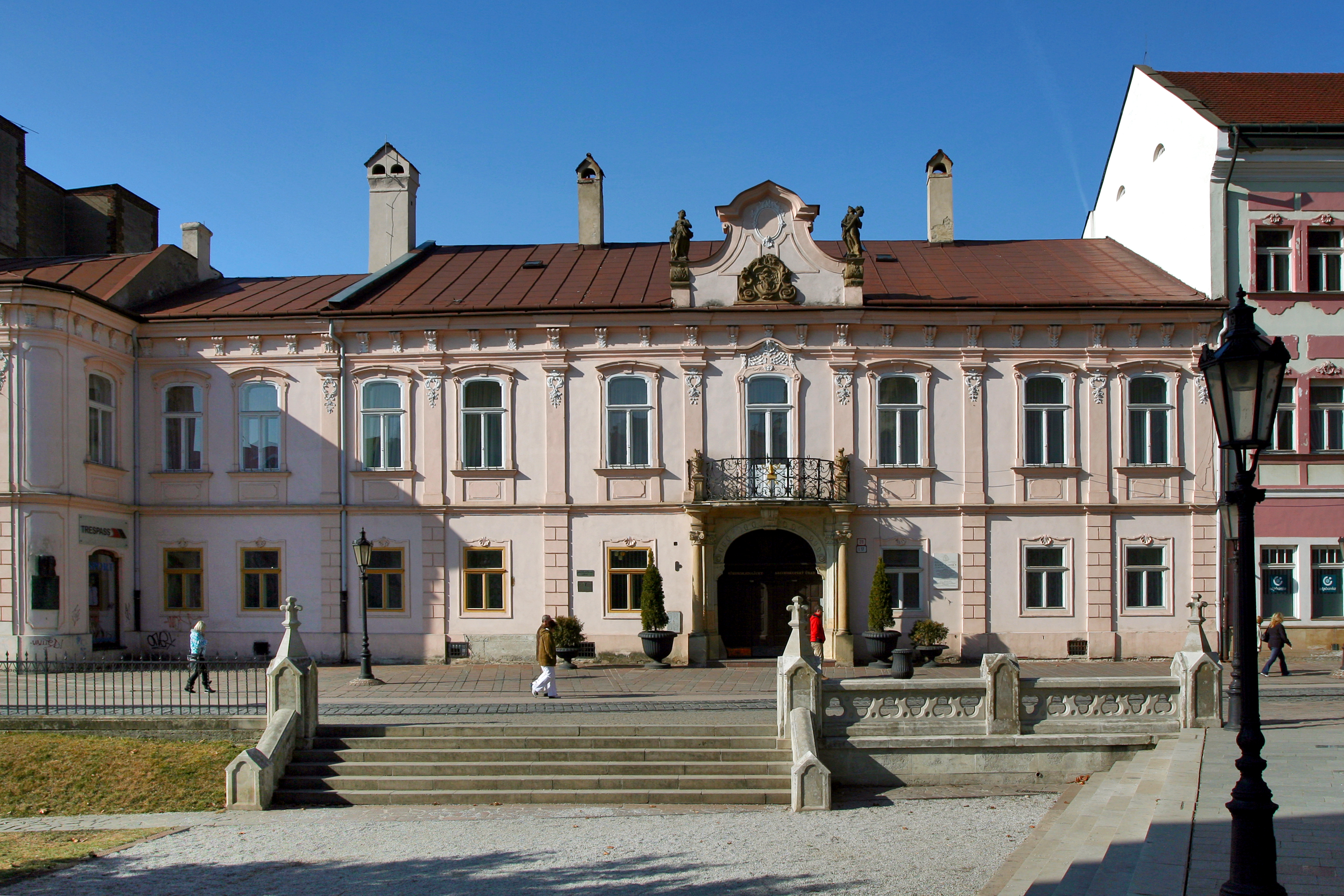
Archbishop's Palace

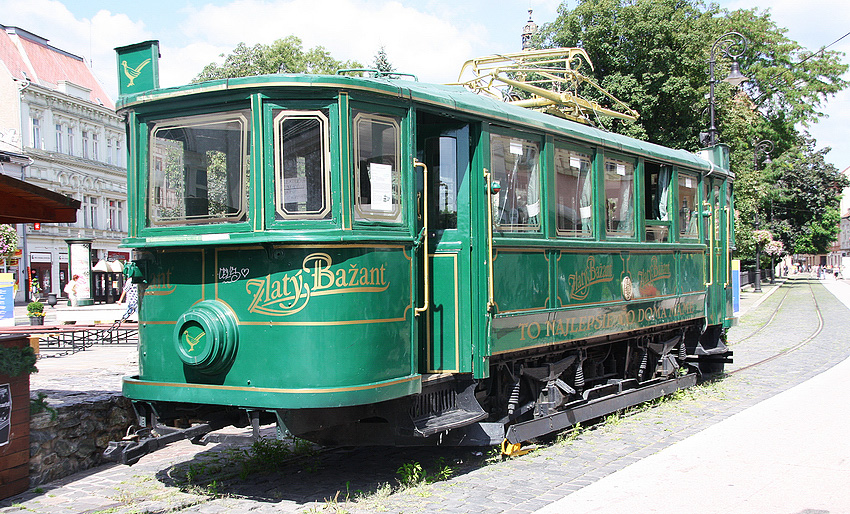
Old tram on Main street
