= Radok =

Radok is a surname. Notable people with the name include:

- Alfréd Radok (1914–1976), Czech stage director and film director
- Emil Radok (1918–1994), Czech film director
- Stephanie Radok (born 1954), Australian artist and writer

== See also ==
- Alfréd Radok Awards for achievements in Czech theatre, starting in 1992
- Radok Lake, meltwater lake in Antarctica
