= Josef Svoboda =

Czech architect, designer, film director and professor (1920–2002)

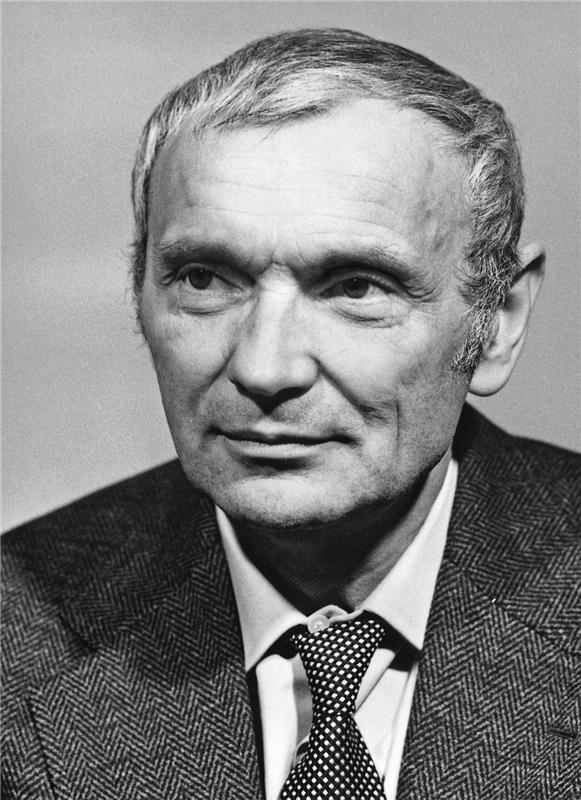
- Born: 10 May 1920; Čáslav
- Died: 8 April 2002 (aged 81); Prague

Josef Svoboda (10 May 1920 – 8 April 2002) was a Czech artist and scenic designer. He was a production designer and director, known for his work on Amadeus (1984), Laterna Magika: Puzzles (1996), and Laterna Magika: Trap (1999).

== Education ==
Svoboda was born in Čáslav, Czechoslovakia (today the Czech Republic). He began his training as an architect at the Central School of Housing in Prague. At the end of World War II, he became interested in theatre and design. He began to study scenography at the Prague Conservatory and architecture at the Academy of Applied Arts.

== Career ==
Svoboda became the principal designer at the Czech National Theatre in 1948 and held that position for more than 30 years. His multimedia installations Laterna Magika and Polyekran, realized together with director Alfréd Radok and his brother Emil on the occasion of the Expo 58 in Brussels, allowed him to be internationally known. These productions introduced the combination of live actors and filmed projections. Svoboda is also responsible for introducing modern technologies and materials such as plastics, hydraulics and lasers into his designs. In 1967, Svoboda created one of his best known special effects, a three-dimensional pillar of light. This was created by the use of an aerosol mixture which revealed low-voltage luminaries.

Josef Svoboda considered himself a scenographer rather than a designer; he chose to show a more holistic, architectural, non-naturalistic approach to design. His 700-plus designs include Insect Comedy (Czech National Theatre, 1946); Rusalka (Teatro La Fenice, Venice, 1958); Carmen (Metropolitan Opera, New York City, 1972); The Firebird (Royal Danish Theatre, Copenhagen, 1972); I Vespri Siliciani (Metropolitan Opera, 1974); Jumpers (Kennedy Center, 1974), many of them realized together with the opera director Václav Kašlík.

He left the Czech National Theatre in 1992. A year later, he became artistic director of the Laterna Magika Theatre.

Svoboda designed the opera sets for the 1984 film Amadeus, directed by his friend Miloš Forman.

== Awards ==
Svoboda's honors and awards include honorary doctorates from the Royal College of Arts in London, Denison and Western Michigan universities in the United States, and awards from the United States Institute for Theatre Technology (USITT). He was made Chevalier dans l'Ordre des Arts et des Lettres in Paris in 1976, and received the French Legion of Honor in 1993.

Josef Svoboda died in Prague, where he was buried on 15 April 2002.
