= Darling Cabaret =

Cabaret in Prague, Czech Republic

- Interactive map of Darling Cabaret
- Address: Ve Smečkách 597/32; Prague 1, 110 00; Czech Republic
- Coordinates: 50°04′47″N 14°25′40″E
- Owner: David Drahokoupil

Construction
- Opened: 2000

Website
- Official website

Darling Cabaret is a cabaret and strip club in Prague, Czech Republic, situated near Wenceslas Square on Ve Smečkách street. It was founded in 2000 and is the largest cabaret in the Czech Republic. The entertainment includes traditional can-can, various acrobatic shows, shows with snakes, and Brazilian Carnival, as well as traditional pole dancing.

== History ==
In the 20th century, there were several cabarets in Prague, but all of them eventually closed, leaving none remaining in the country. The founder of Darling Cabaret was travelling around the world for years and observed both well-known and small local cabarets. On his return to the Czech Republic in 2000 he opened Darling Cabaret in the centre of Prague. In 2010 Darling Cabaret was listed in the Top Ten cabaret clubs in the world by an American magazine.

In 2015, the cabaret won a "Sexist Piggy" award for its adverts placed in men's restrooms in bars or restaurants around Prague.

== Ballet team ==
A ballet team, Darling Ballet, was founded in 2005. As of 2017 there are 12 members of the company, including dancers who had previously performed in the National Theatre, State Opera, and Laterna Magika, among others. Darling Ballet has performed shows in countries including Germany, France, and Japan. Some of the dancers also participate in musicals and are sometimes called to take part in shows in the National Theatre. The team has performed at the ball for Prague City Hall. Darling Ballet's costumes are borrowed for fashion shows and theatre performances around Europe.

The choreographer of Darling Ballet is Slavek Semotam, a graduate of and former teacher at the ballet conservatory, who has also worked at ballet schools in France and Germany, and as a director of several movies and theatre performances.
