= Ondrej Šoth =

Slovak choreographer and playwright

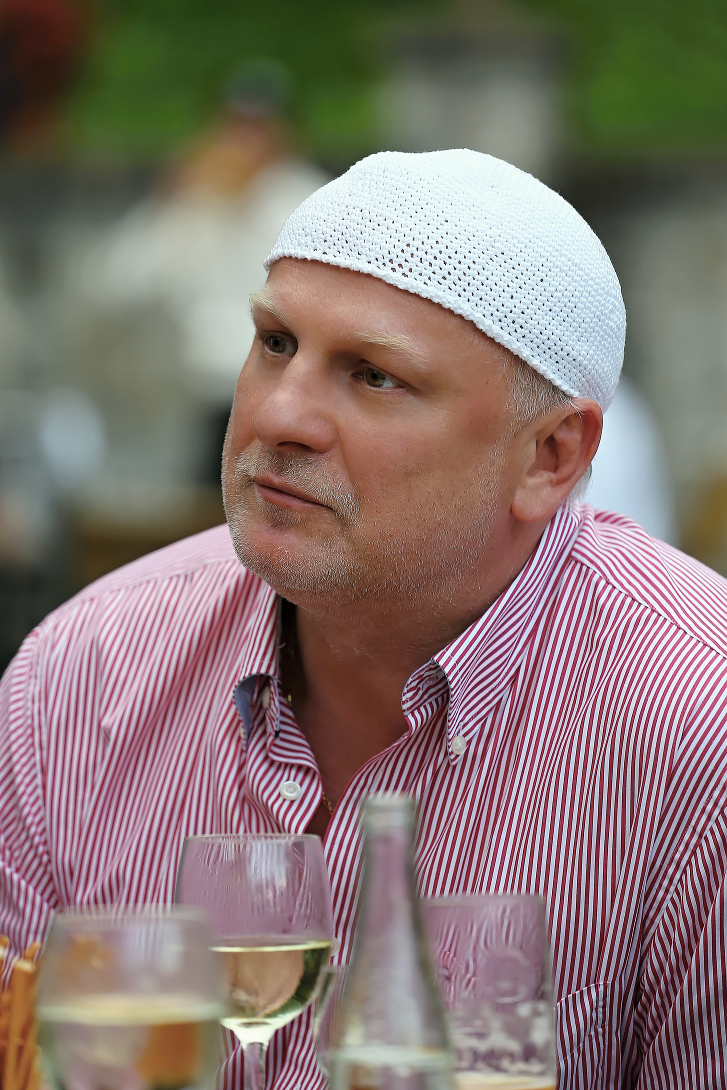
- Ondrej Šoth in 2020
- Born: 23 January 1960 (age 66); Bardejov, Czechoslovakia
- Education: Academy of Performing Arts
- Occupations: Choreographer, theatre director
- Organization: National Theatre Košice
- Spouse: Zuzana Mauréry (1990–1992)
- Parent(s): Andrej Šoth; Terézia Šothová (née Jopeková)
- Relatives: Marian Šoth; Peter Šoth

Ondrej Šoth (born 23 January 1960) is a Slovak choreographer, theatre director and dance teacher. Currently (2024), he is a General director of the National Theatre Košice. He is a former General director of the Slovak National Theatre in Bratislava, former Artistic director of the Ballet of the State Theatre in Košice.

Šoth is the laureate of numerous awards, among the most significant are: the World Ballet Stars Award 2005, the DOSKY 2006/2007 for directing and choreographing the ballet The Marriage of Figaro (Mozart), the Annual Award in the field of theatre from the Literary Fund (2006), the Crystal Wing Award 2009 in the theatre and audiovisual arts category and Laureate of the 10th Theatre Olympics – Budapest – dance theatre W. Shakespeare: Hamlet (2023).

== Childhood ==
Šoth was born in Bardejov into the family of dentist Andrej Šoth and teacher Terézia Šothová (née Jopeková). Influenced by his family environment, he initially aspired to become a doctor. His mother, who noticed his exceptional interest in music and dance from an early age, enrolled him in various dance clubs. At the same time, he also attended the Elementary School of Arts in Bardejov, where he studied accordion. In addition to his artistic pursuits, he was actively involved in sports (football, athletics). He has two brothers, Marian Šoth and Peter Šoth. His cousin, Ján Šoth, currently serves as the Ambassador of the Slovak Republic to France and the Principality of Monaco.

== Education ==
From 1975 to 1979, he studied classical dance at the Conservatory in Košice (Andrej Halász, Marilena Halászová, Csaba Szekeresz, Anna Dlhopolcová and others). He studied choreography and dance directing under Professor Štefan Nosál at the Academy of Performing Arts in Bratislava from 1979 to 1983. He earned his ArtD degree from the Faculty of Music at the Academy of Performing Arts in Bratislava in 2009.

== Professional career in the Czech Republic ==
Shortly after finishing his studies, he accepted a position as a choreographer in the Prague Chamber Ballet of Pavel Šmok (1984–1985). Later, he worked at the National Theatre in Prague (Vladimír Godár: Orbis Pictus, Carl Orff: Carmina Burana), and in Laterna Magika (Michael Kocáb, Evald Schorm, Jaroslav Kučera: Odysseus). Alongside his choreographic work, he taught at the Academy of Performing Arts in Prague (1994–1996) and at the Prague Conservatory (1994–1996).

During his time in the Czech Republic, he also performed on foreign stages. In Germany at Arts Concerts Munich, the National Theatre in Kyiv and in France. He taught at the State Drama School in Kraków, the Royal Conservatory in Liège (Belgium) and the Academy of Arts in Paris. He also participated in several study stays in China, India, Japan, France, and the USA. Reflecting on his six-month stay in Tibet, he said: "In summary, I learned to be myself, to share what each of us has in ourselves with others. I learned to put my mind and body in order."

== Managerial positions ==
In 1994, he became the Head of the ballet at the Municipal Theatre in Ústí nad Labem, where he worked for four years. During his managerial work, he choreographed and directed premieres of productions such as G. Verdi's Requiem, P.I. Tchaikovsky's Romeo and Juliet and Carmen by G. Bizet, R. Shchedrin, and Deep Forest.

In 2010, after a selection process, he was appointed the General director of the Slovak National Theatre in Bratislava (2010–2011). Later, he served as the Artistic director of the ballet at the State Theatre in Košice. In 2020, following a successful competition, he became the General director of the National Theatre in Košice.

== Creative principles of choreographic work ==
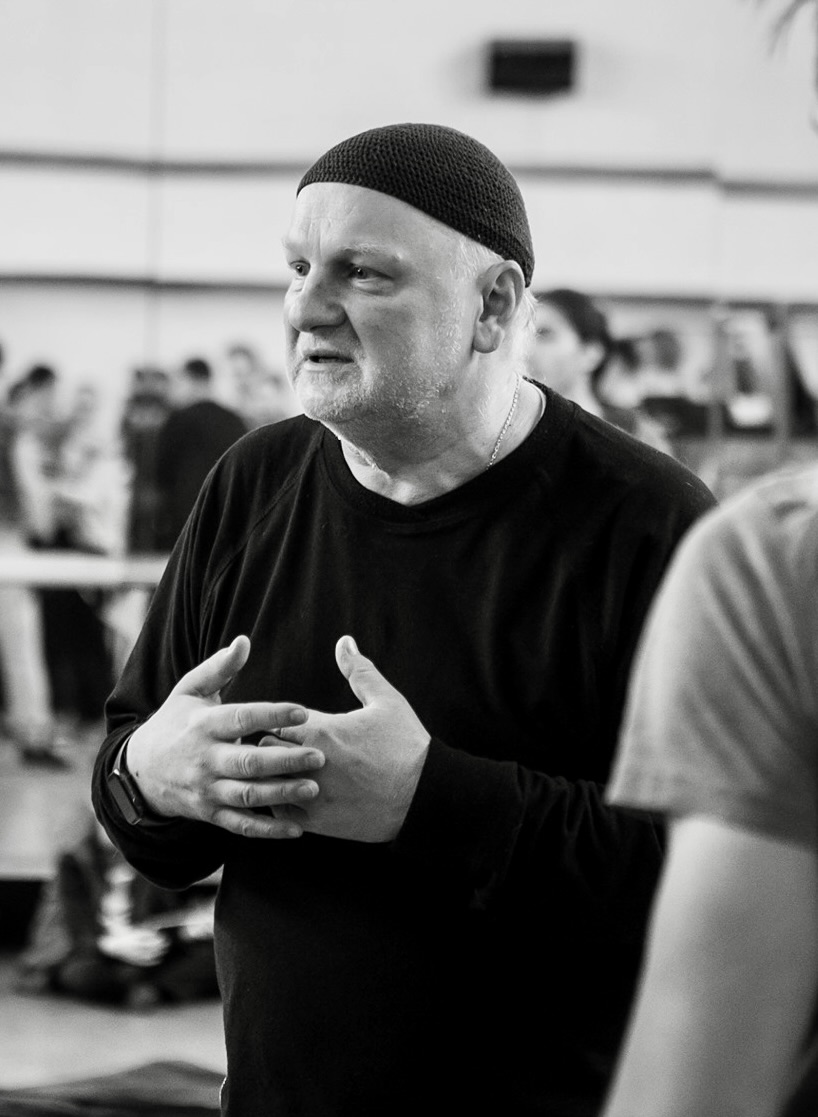
Ondrej_Šoth,_choreograf,_režisér

In his creative work, he leans towards modern forms and expressive means in dance art. As a choreographer, he emphasizes the psychological depth of characters, the detailed depiction of personalities, the credibility of situations and scenes, and their justification in the language of movement. His motto is "the inner world of a man."

"Sometimes, art is created to be socially acceptable. It is romantic, beautiful, simple, entertaining, musical and it pleases the masses. Well, why not? But that is not what true art is about. I believe, that theatre is a reflection of contemporary reality and all situations—political and moral—that affect the human soul. The present, from a political perspective, is sometimes almost unbearable, not only in Slovakia but also in Europe and worldwide."

He has collaborated with many prominent theatre directors (such as Ľubomír Vajdička, Roman Polák, Jozef Bednárik, Marián Chudovský). His film collaborations are also interesting, including working with Juraj Jakubisko on the film fairy tale Perinbaba (1984), Peter Weigl on the film opera Romeo and Juliet on the Village (1987) and in Hollywood on the film Open to Hard, starring Ornella Muti, Robert De Niro, and Catherine Deneuve.

== Personal life ==
In 1990, he married actress Zuzana Mauréry. The couple divorced after two years of marriage. He is a fan of football clubs Tatran Prešov, Slovan Bratislava, and Real Madrid. Since his student years, he has actively participated in various charitable projects.

== Selection from choreographic realizations ==
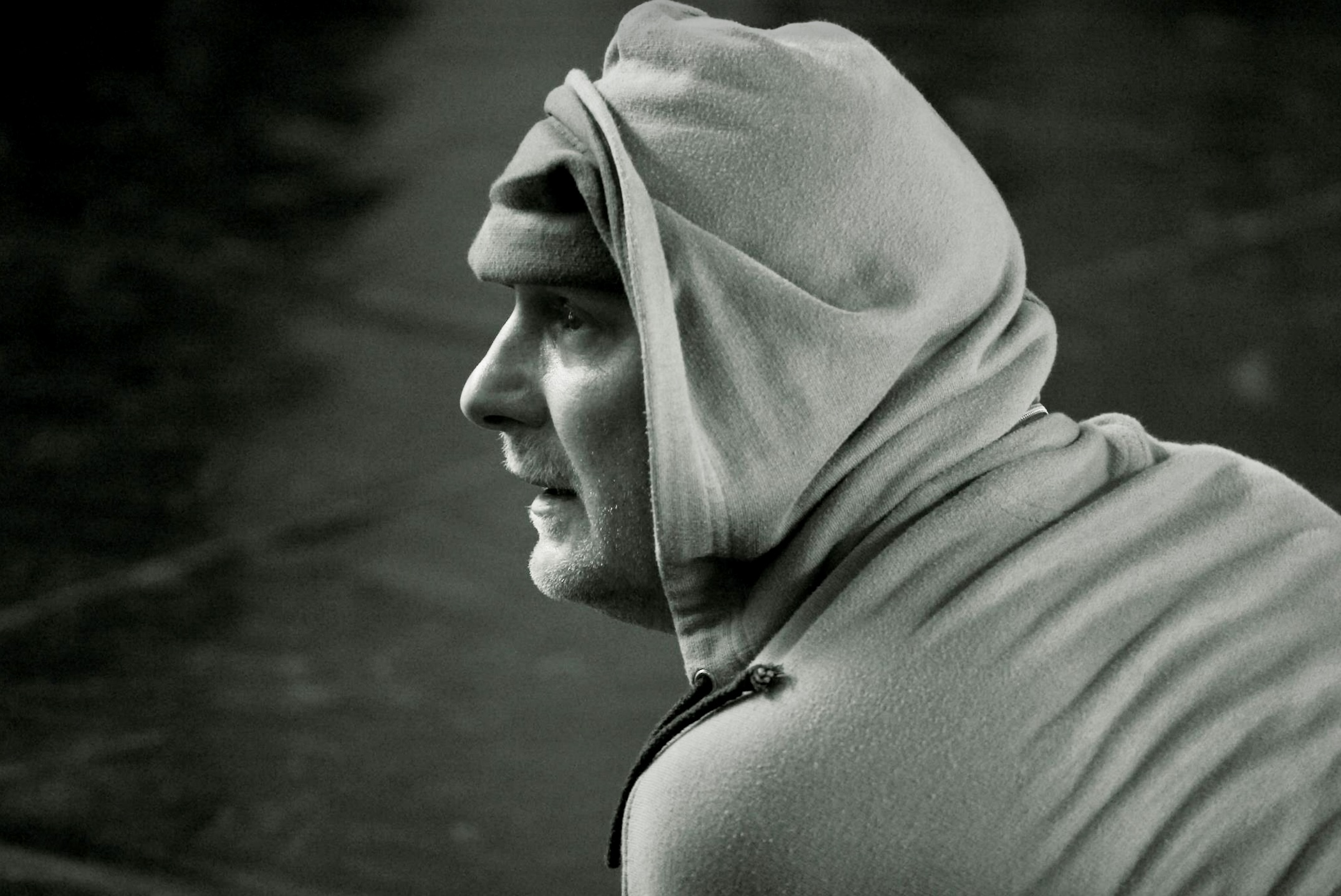
Ondrej Šoth, Choreographer and Director, 2010

• C. Orff: Carmina burana – Košice State Theatre (1983) • Szelepcsényi: Three Horehrons – Prague Chamber Ballet by P. Šmok (1984) • V. Godár: Orbis Pictus – National Theatre Prague, Laterna Magika (1985) • G. Verdi: Requiem – Slovak National Theatre (1988) • C. Orff: Carmina burana – National Theatre Prague (1989) • M. Pavlíček: A special joy to live – Slovak National Theatre (1990) • F. Kafka: Light in the Darkness – Slovak National Theatre (1992) • V. Godár: Sonata for violin and piano – Prague Chamber Ballet by P. Šmok (1995) • C. Orff: Carmina burana – Germany – open air opera, Munich (1995) • P. I. Tchaikovsky: Romeo and Juliet + tour: Vienna, Salzburg, Frankfurt, Stuttgart, Hamburg, Strasbourg, Düsseldorf, Rio de Janeiro, São Paulo, Madrid, Barcelona (1995) • R. Ščedrin, Deep Forrest: Carmen – Municipal Theatre Ústí nad Labem (1997) • Ezio: Baroque Opera – Theater Bayreuth (1998) • C. Orff: Carmina burana – Slovak National Theatre, Bratislava (1999) • G. Verdi: Requiem – Slovak National Theatre, Bratislava (1999) • G. Mahler: Adagietto – Slovak National Theatre, Bratislava (1999) • G. Kancheli: Light sorrow – State Theatre Košice • A. de Saint-Exupéry – Michal Pavlíček: The Little Prince – State theatre Košice, •. E I. Stravinsky: The Rite of Spring – Košice State Theatre • W. Shakespeare: Romeo and Juliet – Košice State Theatre •. O. Šoth: Wedding according to Figaro (Mozart) – State Theatre Košice • Juraj Kubánka, Ondrej Šoth, Maksym Sklyar: M.R. Štefánik – Košice State Theatre • Juraj Kubánka, Ondrej Šoth, Maksyim Sklyar, Folk music Železiar: Jánošík – State Theatre Košice • A. de Saint-Exupéry, M. Pavlíček: The Little Prince – CIS Bratislava • M. Kocáb: Odysseus – SND Bratislava • Ondrej Šoth, Zuzana Mistríková: Sándor Márai – Košice State Theatre • Thomas Mann: Death in Venice – Košice State Theatre • Ondrej Šoth, Marek Šarišský: Charlie Chaplin – Košice State Theatre • Ondrej Šoth, Zuzana Mistríková: Diary of Anne Frank – State Theatre Košice • Nelson Perez, Maksym Sklyar, Ondrej Šoth: Hamlet – Košice State Theatre • Ondrej Šoth, Zuzana Mistríková: Native land – Košice State Theatre • Ondrej Šoth, Zuzana Mistríková: Milada Horáková – Košice State Theatre • Ondrej Šoth, Zuzana Mistríková: Nureyev – Košice State Theatre

== Film cooperations ==
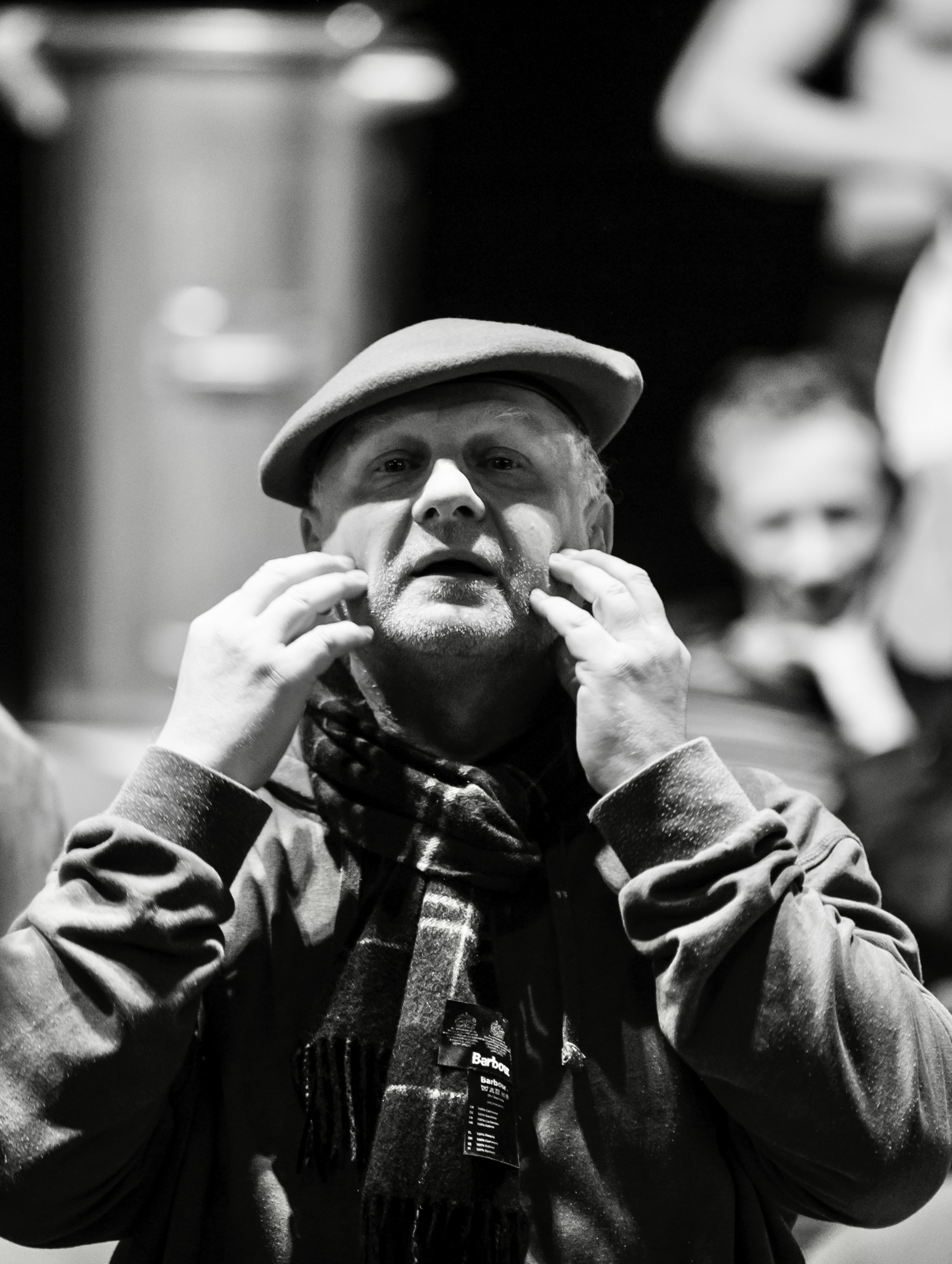
Ondrej Šoth in 2020

- 1984 – J. Jakubisko: Perinbaba
- 1987 – P. Weigl: Romeo and Juliet in the Village (film opera)
- 1994 – P. Monie: Gitanes – France
- 1994 – J. Holec: Son of poor parents
- 2019 – Ondrej Trojan: Bourák

== Theatre prizes ==
- 2006 – Annual prize of the Literary Fund in the field of theatre – The Little Prince
- 2007 – DOSKY 2006/2007 – for the direction and choreography of the ballet and for the best production – The Marriage of Figaro (Mozart)
- 2008 – Award of the Minister of Culture of the Slovak Republic for the year 2007 for the direction and choreography of the ballet The Marriage of Figaro (Mozart)
- 2010 – Crystal Wing in the field of theatre and audiovisual art for multimedia dance theare M.R. Štefánik
- 2014 – Annual prize of the Literary Fund for direction and choreography of the show Death in Venice
- 2018 – Annual prize of the Literary Fund for directing the play Hamlet
- 2023 – Laureate of the 10th Theatre Olympics – Budapest – dance theatre W. Shakespeare: Hamlet(2023).
