= Distant Journey =

- Theatrical release poster
- Directed by: Alfréd Radok
- Written by: Erik Kolár; Mojmír Drvota; Alfréd Radok
- Starring: Blanka Waleská; Otomar Krejča
- Narrated by: Václav Voska
- Cinematography: Josef Střecha
- Edited by: Jiřina Lukešová
- Music by: Jiří Sternwald
- Production company: Československý státní film
- Release date: June 1949
- Running time: 108 minutes
- Country: Czechoslovakia
- Language: Czech

Distant Journey (Czech: Daleká cesta) is a Czechoslovak film about the Holocaust directed by Alfréd Radok and released in 1949, not long after World War II. Radok uses experimental cinematography, blending historic footage of the Nazis with a fictional love story between a Jewish woman and her Gentile husband.

Soon after the film's release, Stalinist censorship was implemented in Czechoslovakia. The film was not allowed to have a premiere in Prague. It was only shown in small theatres outside of Prague until it was banned completely.

== Summary ==
Distant Journey follows Hana, a Jewish eye doctor who falls in love and marries a Gentile named Toník. Their simple love story becomes a nightmare when the government begins the systematized extermination of the Jews. Hana's family is transported to Theresienstadt, and the romance becomes a struggle for survival.

Radok never shows blood or lets a gun fire in his story, but the historic footage he integrates into the film achieves a sense of terror. Newsreel footage and clips from Leni Riefenstahl's Triumph of the Will show Adolf Hitler, Joseph Goebbels, and other Nazi leaders reading speeches while a pile of dead nude bodies on the grounds of a concentration camp enforce the atmosphere of the Holocaust. While the historic war-time footage is shown, the previous scene of the feature film is shrunk to the lower right hand corner of the screen, a picture-in-picture effect comparing the wider global conflict to the more immediate effects on the story's central characters.

The slow spread of anti-Semitism that led to the deportation and murder of the Jews is played out in the film. For example, in 1941 Jews were no longer allowed to go to the theater in Prague. Dressed in stunning attire, the happy couple are just about to leave for the theater when they receive this foreboding news from Hana's dejected father. In this way, Radok feeds his audience the history of the war through a personal and easily digested narrative.

The film is full of symbolic cinematography. For example, when a minor character, Professor Reiter, commits suicide, strange camera angles show the old man sitting in his apartment, his open window, the cobblestone street far below, and the stopped hands on a clock. When shrill screams echo from the street and the apartment is empty, the audience is to assume the awful truth.

== Cast ==
- Blanka Waleská as Dr. Hana Kaufmannová
- Otomar Krejča as Dr. Antonín Bureš
- Viktor Očásek as Oskar Kaufmann
- Zdeňka Baldová as Hedvika Kaufmannová
- Jiří Spirit as Honzík Kaufmann
- Eduard Kohout as Prof. Reiter
- J. O. Martin as Rudolf Bureš
- Josef Chvalina as Pepa Bureš
- Zdeněk Hodr as Zdeněk Klein, Hana's old friend
- Saša Rašilov as Businessman Mošeles
- Jan S. Kolár as Gestapo officer Müller

== Reception ==
In the Village Voice J. Hoberman called it a "masterpiece", comparing Radok to Orson Welles New York Times critic Bosley Crowther described it as "the most brilliant, the most horrifying film on the Nazi's persecution of the Jews that this reviewer has yet seen". The film is applauded for both its expressionist cinematography and historical relevance, being one of the first films to confront the Holocaust, only three years after it occurred.

After being banned in Czechoslovakia for forty years, the movie reemerged after the Velvet Revolution for a 1991 television premiere, and was hailed as a masterpiece by local critics. In 1998 poll of 55 Czech and Slovak film critics and publicists Distant Journey was voted 6th best Czechoslovak movie of all time.

== Trivia ==
Footage from Distant Journey appears in Stanley Kubrick's 1971 film A Clockwork Orange. Kubrick incorporated the shots of children playing amidst rubble into his film.

== Bibliography ==
- Kerner, Aaron (2011). Film and the Holocaust: New Perspectives on Dramas, Documentaries, and Experimental Films. Continuum. ISBN 9781441124180.
- Camino, Mercedes (2018). Memories of Resistance and the Holocaust on Film. Palgrave Macmillan UK. ISBN 978-1-137-49968-4.
- Hames, Peter (2010). Czech and Slovak Cinema. Edinburgh University Press. ISBN 978-0748620821.
- Škvorecký, Josef (1975). All the Bright Young Men and Women: A Personal History of the Czech Cinema. Toronto: Peter Martin Assoc. ISBN 9780887781100.
- Sladovníková, Šárka (2018). The Holocaust in Czechoslovak and Czech feature films. Stuttgart, Germany: ibidem-Verlag / ibidem Press. ISBN 9783838211961.
