= Divotvorný klobouk =

- Directed by: Alfréd Radok
- Written by: Alfréd Radok
- Based on: Divotvorný klobouk by Václav Kliment Klicpera
- Starring: Saša Rašilov; Josef Kemr
- Cinematography: Josef Střecha
- Edited by: Jiřina Lukešová
- Music by: Jiří Sternwald
- Production company: Studio uměleckého filmu
- Distributed by: Rozdělovna filmů Československého státního filmu
- Release date: July 3, 1953
- Running time: 74 minutes
- Country: Czechoslovakia
- Language: Czech

Divotvorný klobouk (English: The Magical Hat) is a 1952 Czech musical comedy film directed by Alfréd Radok.

== Production ==
The state owned film production studio allocated a very small budget, because the film was not ideological and therefore not considered important. During the shooting Radok was criticized for being a formalist, the filming was stopped and the movie was almost given to another director. At the screening for the film council the film was criticized for being too expressionistic and unrealistic. Later it was recommended to not be sent to distribution. Radok was forced to make changes in the movie and was fired from the film studio.

== Cast ==
- Saša Rašilov as Merchant Koliáš
- Josef Kemr as Painter Antonín Strnad
- Zdeněk Dítě as Student Tomáš Křepelka
- Alena Kreuzmannová as Bětuška, Koliáš's niece
- Theodor Pištěk as Innkeeper Barnabáš
- Rudolf Pellar as Folksinger Pohořalský
- Jiří Novotný as Apprentice František
- František Kovářík as Veteran Václav
- Jaromír Pleskot as Butler Zvonek
- Jarmila Bechyňová as Publican
- František Šlégr as Informer Knopp
