= Cerhenice =

Market town in the Czech Republic

- Market town
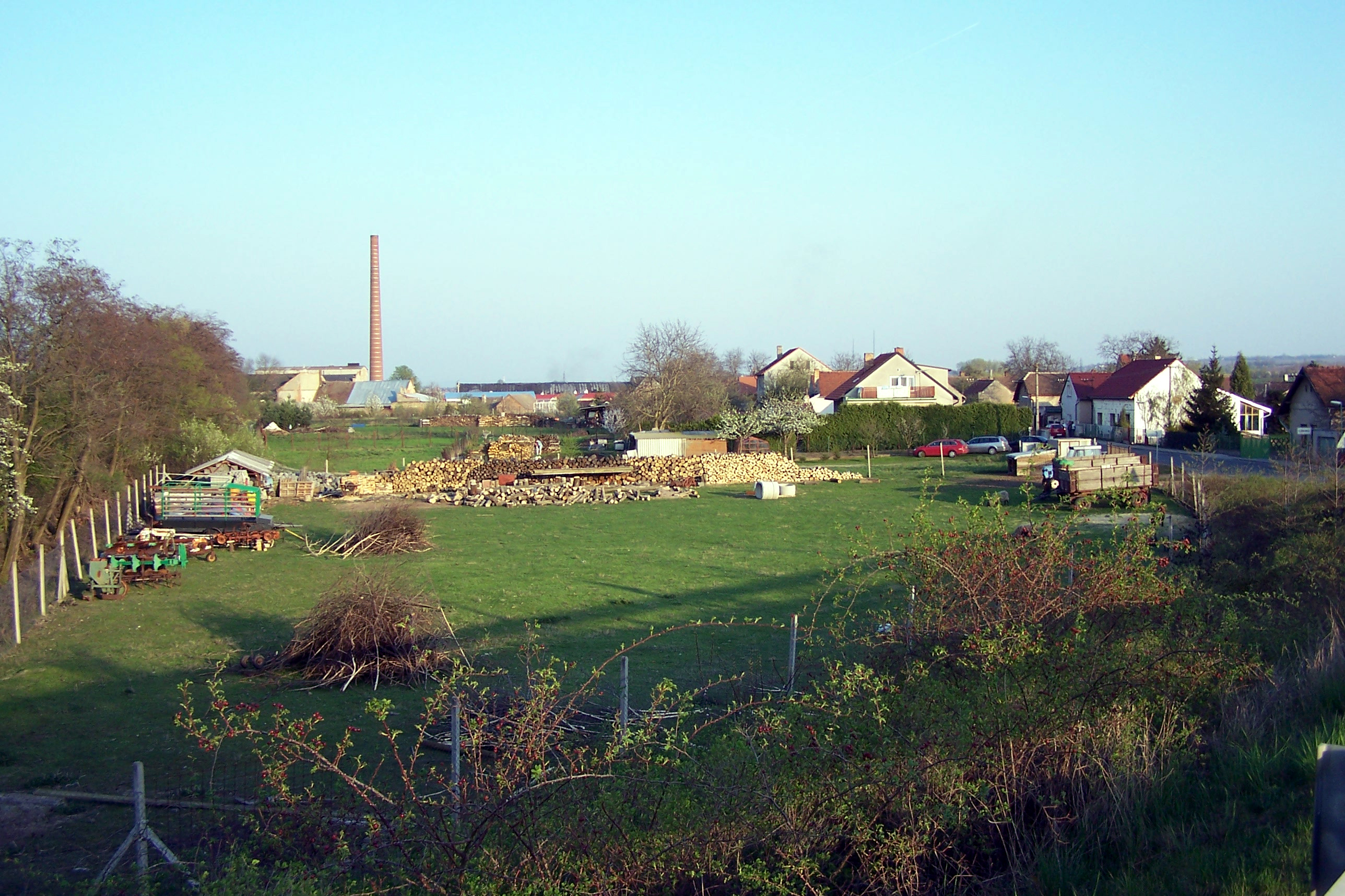
- View of Cerhenice

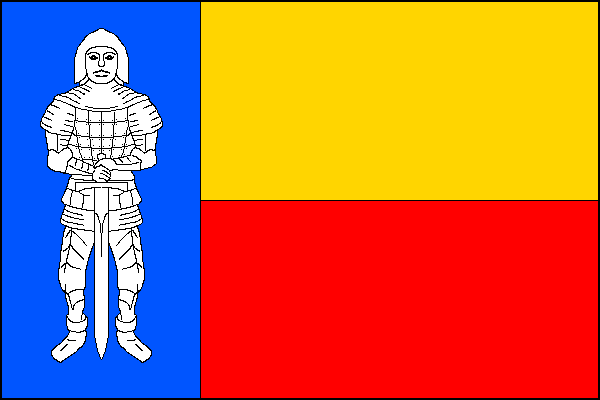
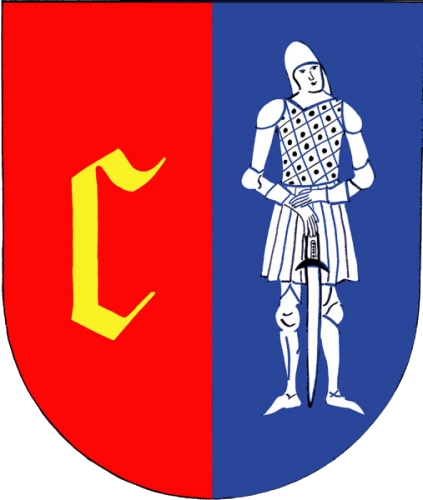
- Flag Coat of arms

- Location in the Czech Republic
- Coordinates: 50°4′17″N 15°4′20″E
- Country: Czech Republic
- Region: Central Bohemian
- District: Kolín
- First mentioned: 1295

Area
  - Total: 10.64 km^{2} (4.11 sq mi)
- Elevation: 209 m (686 ft)

Population (2026-01-01)
  - Total: 1,955
  - Density: 183.7/km^{2} (475.9/sq mi)
- Time zone: UTC+1 (CET)
  - Summer (DST): UTC+2 (CEST)
- Postal codes: 280 02, 281 02
- Website: www.cerhenice.cz

Cerhenice (Czech pronunciation: [ˈtsɛrɦɛɲɪtsɛ]) is a market town in Kolín District in the Central Bohemian Region of the Czech Republic. It has about 2,000 inhabitants.

== Administrative division ==
Cerhenice consists of two municipal parts (in brackets population according to the 2021 census):

- Cerhenice (1,553)
- Cerhýnky (238)

== Etymology ==
The initial name of the village was Crhynice, meaning "the village of Crhyň's people".

== Geography ==
Cerhenice is located about 10 kilometres (6 mi) northwest of Kolín and 38 km (24 mi) east of Prague. It lies in a flat agricultural landscape in the Central Elbe Table.

== History ==
The first written mention of Cerhenice is from 1295. For centuries, it was owned by various lesser noblemen. Around 1520, during the rule of Eliška of Střížkov, the village was promoted to a market town. For the longest time, Cerhenice was owned by the Střela of Rokyce family (1550–1689). Among the most notable owners were the Sternberg family, who inherited Cerhenice in 1689, and the Kolowrat family, who bought it from the Sternbergs in 1757.

== Demographics ==
Historical population

| Year | Pop. | ±% |
|---|---|---|
| 1869 | 1,312 | — |
| 1880 | 1,678 | +27.9% |
| 1890 | 1,724 | +2.7% |
| 1900 | 1,759 | +2.0% |
| 1910 | 1,992 | +13.2% |

| Year | Pop. | ±% |
|---|---|---|
| 1921 | 2,099 | +5.4% |
| 1930 | 2,126 | +1.3% |
| 1950 | 1,784 | −16.1% |
| 1961 | 1,757 | −1.5% |
| 1970 | 1,624 | −7.6% |

| Year | Pop. | ±% |
|---|---|---|
| 1980 | 1,534 | −5.5% |
| 1991 | 1,498 | −2.3% |
| 2001 | 1,482 | −1.1% |
| 2011 | 1,614 | +8.9% |
| 2021 | 1,791 | +11.0% |

Source: Censuses

== Economy ==
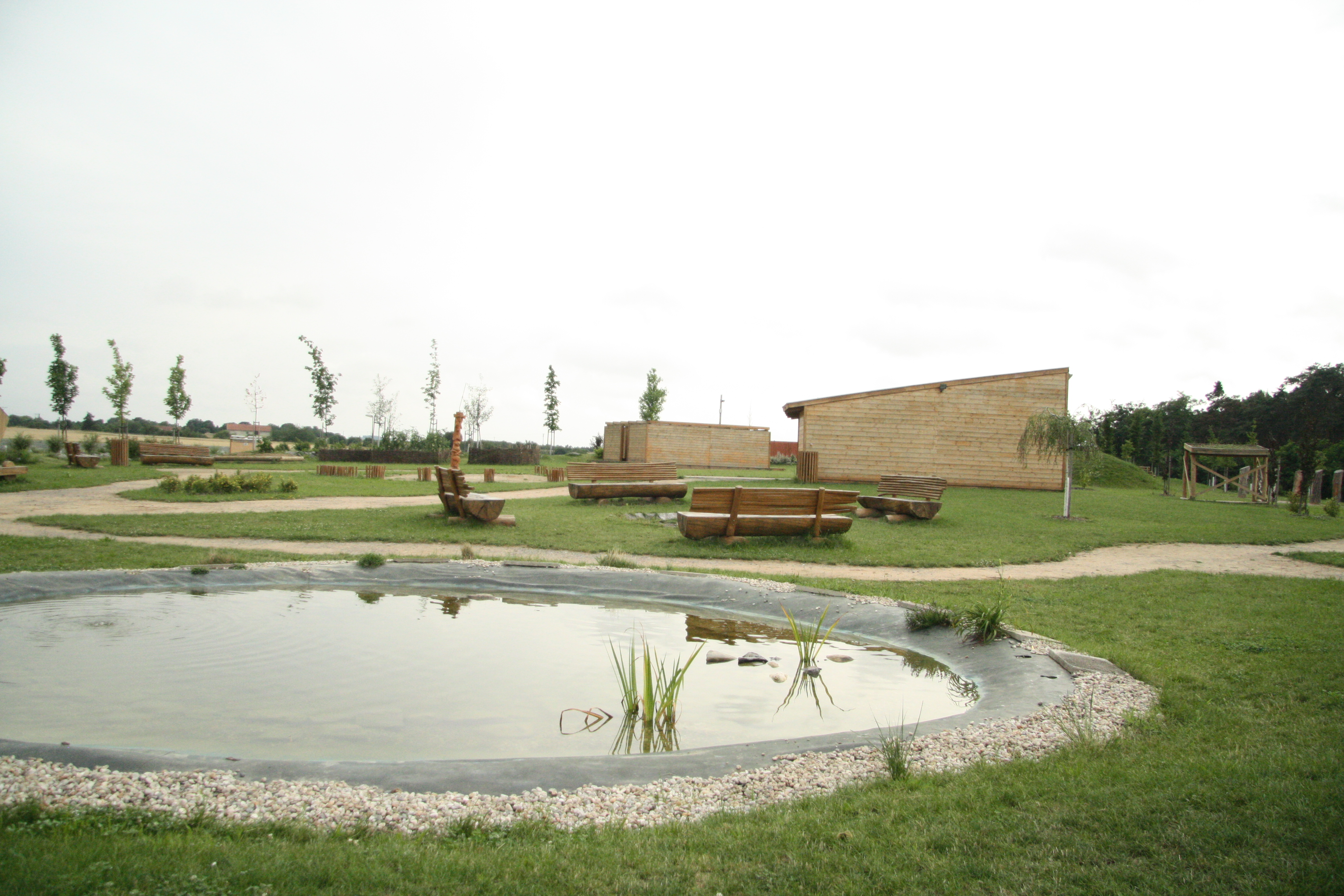
A park in Cerhenice

Part of the Velim railway test circuit is located in the territory of Cerhenice.

== Transport ==
Cerhenice is located on the railway line Prague–Kolín.

== Sights ==
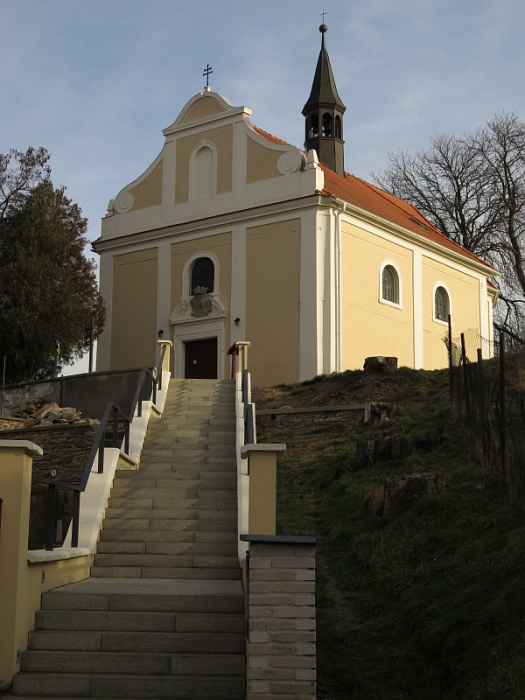
Church of Saint John of Nepomuk

The Church of Saint John of Nepomuk was built in the Baroque style in 1734, by Countess Leopoldina of Sternberg. She also had built the statue of Our Lady of Sorrows from 1745, located in the middle of the town square.

The Gothic fortress in Cerhenice was built in 1340. In 1618, it was rebuilt in the Renaissance style. The fortress was looted by rebellious peasants in 1775 and three years later, the administration was moved to the newly built castle in the neighbourhood. In modern times, the building was converted into apartments.

The Cerhenice Castle was built on the site of the farm buildings of the old fortress in 1770–1771. It was built by the Institute of Nobles in Prague and never served as the residence of the nobility. It is a one-storey Baroque building. Today it is privately owned.

== Notable people ==
- Blanka Waleská (1910–1986), actress
