= Blanka Waleská =

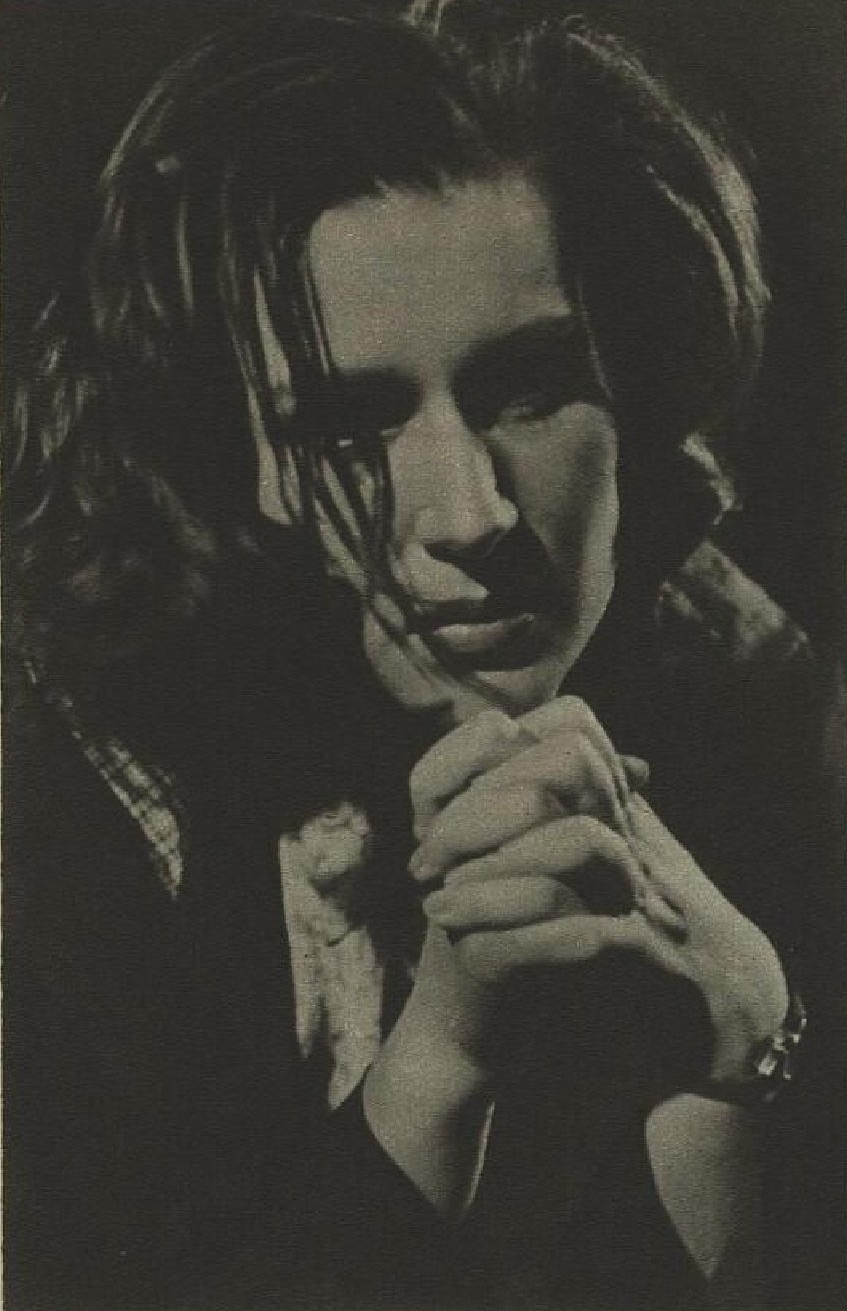
- Waleská in 1948
- Born: Blanka Wedlichová; 19 May 1910; Cerhenice, Bohemia, Austria-Hungary
- Died: 6 July 1986 (aged 76); Prague, Czechoslovakia
- Occupation: Actress

Signature
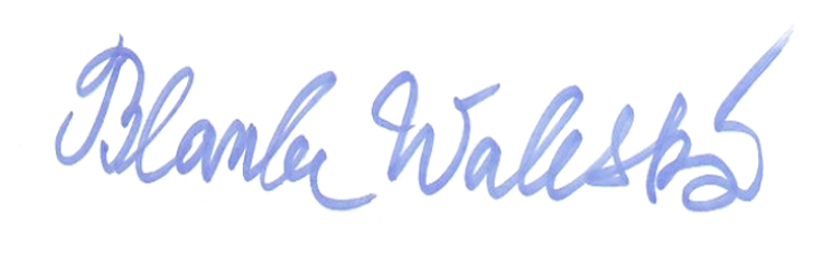

Blanka Waleská (real name Blanka Wedlichová; 19 May 1910 – 6 July 1986) was a Czech actress.

== Career ==
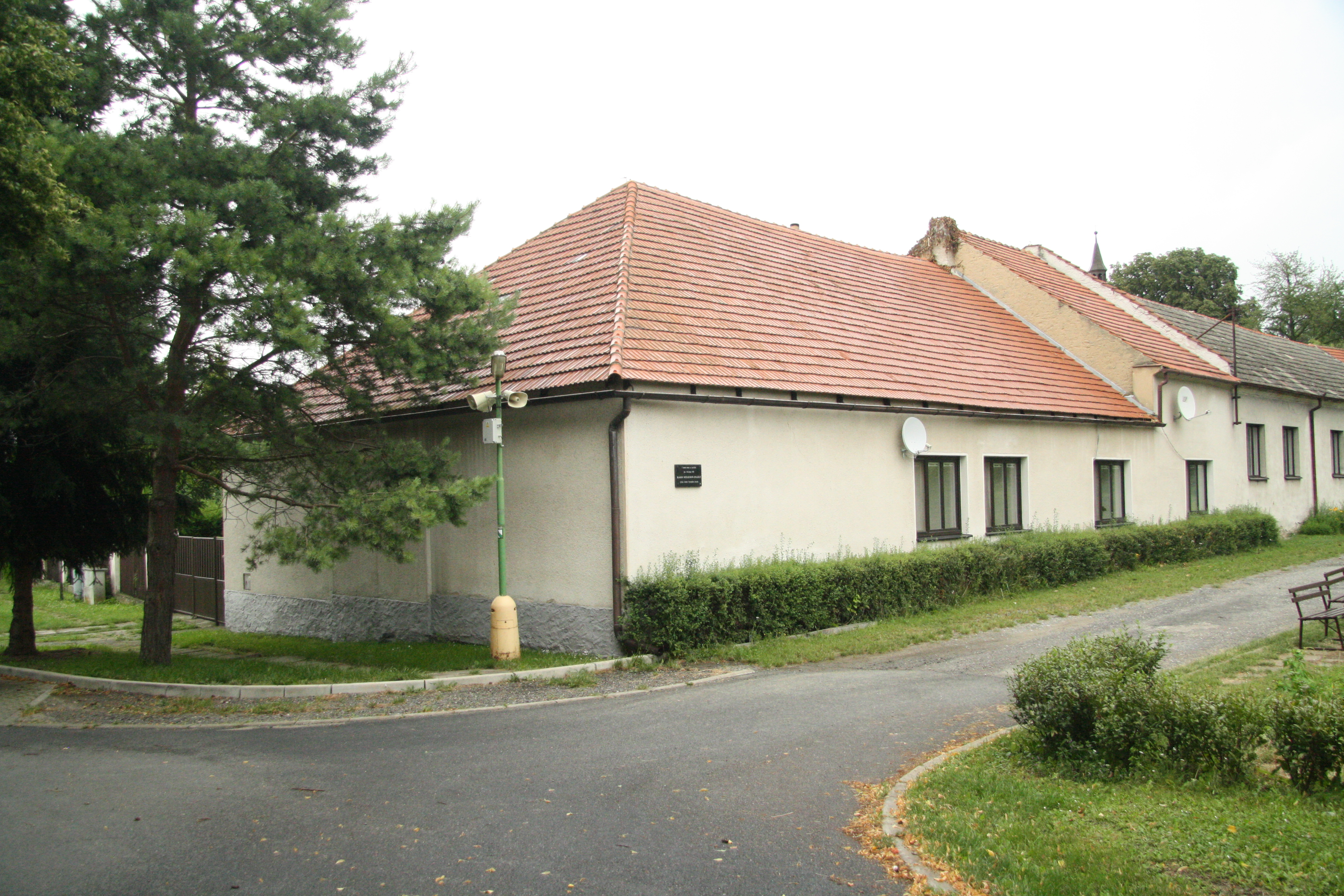
Native house of Blanka Waleská in Cerhenice

Waleská was primarily a theatre actress. She also appeared on radio and television and was involved in dubbing.

She starred in the 1970 film Witchhammer under director Otakar Vávra.
