= Archbishop's Palace (Košice) =

Palace in Košice, Slovakia

- Arcibiskupský palá
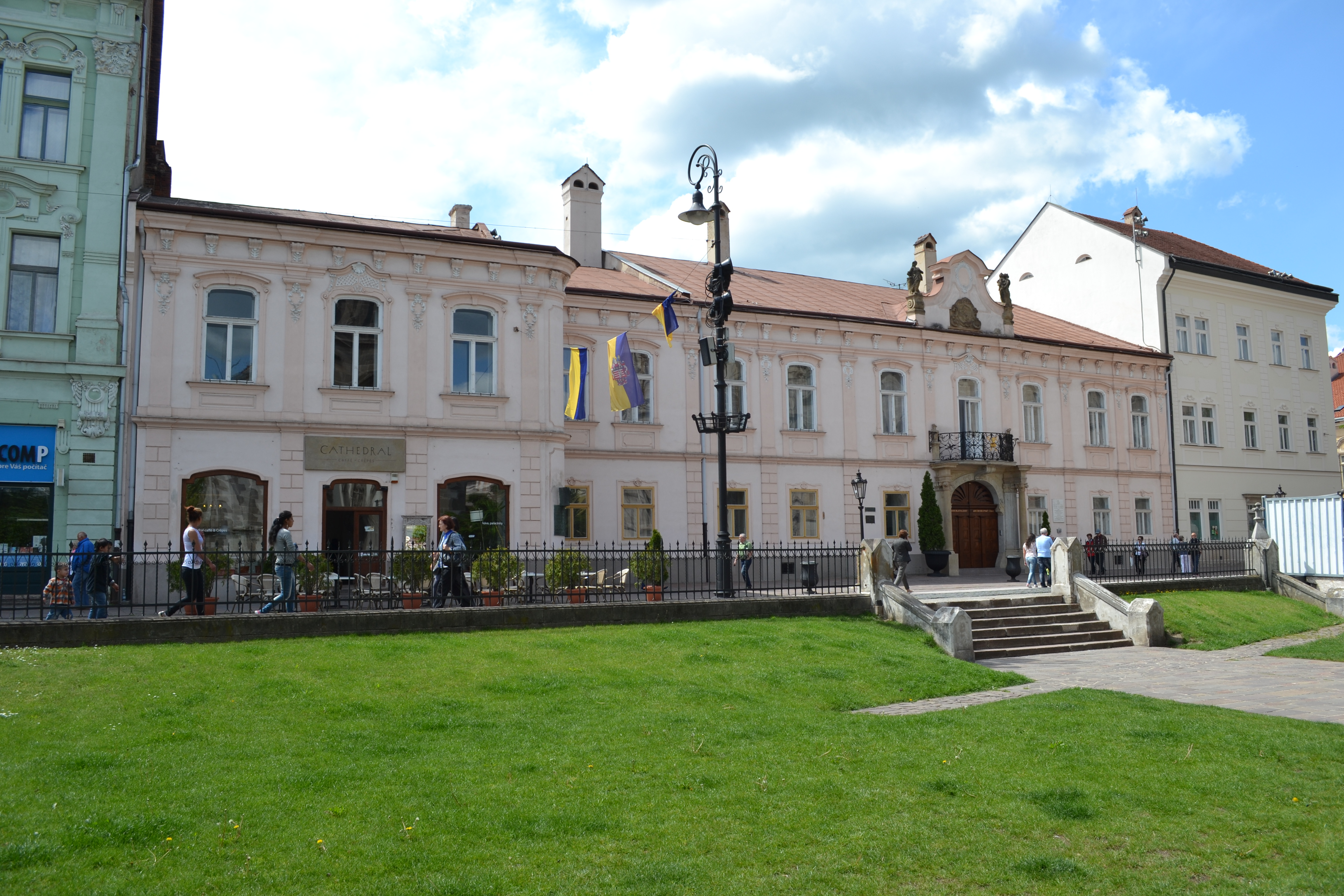

General information
- Type: Palace
- Architectural style: Rococo, Classical
- Location: Old Town, Košice
- Country: Slovakia
- Coordinates: 48.719907°N 21.257776°E

The Archbishop's Palace of Košice, Slovakia, is a rococo-classical building, formerly the home of Austro-Hungarian Emperor Franz Joseph I.

== History ==
In the past Košice belonged to the diocese of Jäger, which was founded in 1001. After more than eight centuries, in 1804, it was considered difficult to administer such a large territory with an ever-increasing number of believers. On this basis, the new diocese of Košice was established, with St. Andrew as its patron saint. The first bishop of the newly established diocese was Andrej Szabó. The location of his residence was to be as close to St. Elizabeth's Cathedral as to the parish itself. So it was decided to buy four houses on Hlavná Street, which were gradually rebuilt into one separate building. In this way, the Bishop's Palace was created, adjacent to the rectory and the bank, which was one of the oldest savings banks in Košice.

The residence itself was built in 1809 and burnt down on 28 May 1841 when it was engulfed in flames from the Vitéz House. It was repaired by Bishop Anton Ocskay. After the subsequent reconstruction, the Austro-Hungarian Emperor Franz Joseph I (in 1851, 1857) lived here. At this time, the building also housed the bishop's library and a rare gallery of the bishops of the diocese, which was created in 1893. In the residence, in the left wing of the building, there was a chapel. The Košice diocese was longest ennobled by Monsignor Dr. Jozef Čársky. After his death in 1962, the Košice episcopal office remained vacant until the end of socialism. Later, it housed the ecclesiastical court and chaplains and nuns.

In 1995, Pope John Paul II visited Košice. During his visit, he elevated the bishop of Košice, Alojz Tkáč, to the rank of archbishop. Subsequently, he divided Slovakia from one archbishopric into two: the Archbishopric of Bratislava-Trnava and the Archbishopric of Košice. The bishop's palace became the current archbishop's palace, where the archbishopric is still housed today.

== Memorial ==
In 1849, the well-known leaders of the Slovak nation, Ľudovít Štúr and Jonáš Záborský, met here, which is marked by a commemorative plaque on the facade of the building, above which is a relief double portrait of Ľudovít Štúr and Jonáš Záborský.

The author of the memorial is the academic sculptor Juraj Bartusz. The monument was unveiled in 1972.

In 1996, a memorial plaque in white marble was unveiled to the Roman Catholic bishop Jozef Čárský, who had served here in the past. The author of this memorial is the academic sculptor Arpád Račko.
