= Alfréd Radok =

Czech film director

- Born: 17 December 1914; Koloděje nad Lužnicí, Bohemia, Austria-Hungary (now Czech Republic)
- Died: 22 April 1976 (aged 61); Vienna, Austria
- Occupations: Film director, stage director actor, screenwriter
- Years active: 1938–1976

Alfréd Radok (17 December 1914 in – 22 April 1976) was a distinguished Czech stage director and film director. Radok's work belongs with the top Czech stage direction of the 20th century. He is often cited as a formalist in his work.

== Biography ==
Radok was born in Koloděje nad Lužnicí. His father Viktor Radok was Jewish, and his mother Olga, née Toushková, was Catholic. He got baptized just before the World War II started in 1939. Radok planned to study journalism and theatre in Prague, but after German occupation all universities were closed down by the Nazis. He then started his own amateur theatre company called Mladá scéna with his brother Emil in Valašské Meziříčí. In 1940 Radok was hired by the theatre of E. F. Burian, D34, in Prague and worked there until Burian's arrest in 1941, when the theatre was closed. Alfréd then continued in other theatres as an assistant director but was forced to leave because of his Jewish heritage. In 1944 he was sent to Klettendorf labour camp. After an allied air raid in January 1945 he managed to escape and returned to Czechoslovakia. His father and every relative on his father's side of the family were murdered in the Holocaust.

In 1948 he directed a film Distant Journey about the Holocaust. In Czechoslovakia Otakar Vávra and other communist executives in the state controlled film industry were critical of the movie. As a result, it only received a limited release in provincial cinemas, however internationally the film achieved critical success. The New York Times selected it to be among top 10 movies of 1950. Radok worked as a guest director at National Theatre in Prague in the years 1948 to 1949. He directed a musical comedy film Divotvorný klobouk in 1953 and a historical comedy about automobilism Vintage Car in 1956. In the same year he was hired by the National Theatre.

For the Czechoslovak pavilion at Expo 58 in Brussels Radok co-created the multimedia theatre show Laterna Magika, which combined live actors with projections on multiple irregularly shaped projection screens. His collaborators were scenographer Josef Svoboda, screenwriter Miloš Forman and directors Emil Radok, Vladimír Svitáček and Ján Roháč. Laterna Magika was a huge success at the Expo and the permanent scene was created at The New Stage of the National Theatre in Prague in 1959. However next year Radok was fired from the theatre for political reasons. After that he worked at Městská divadla pražská until 1966, when he was allowed to direct at the National Theatre again. When Czechoslovkia was invaded in 1968 by Warsaw Pact armies he decided to leave to Sweden with his family. He directed plays at Folkteatern in Gothenburg until 1972. In 1976 he was invited to direct Václav Havel's play in Burgtheater, Vienna, but after arriving to Vienna he fell ill and died on 22 April 1976.

== Personal life ==
He was married to Marie Radoková (1922–2003). They had two children – a son David (born 1954), who is a stage director, and a daughter Barbara (born 1948). His younger brother Emil Radok (1918–1994) was also a director and Alfréd's collaborator.

== Filmography ==
Year	Title	Notes
1947	Parohy	
1948	Distant Journey	also a screenwriter
1953	Divotvorný klobouk	also a screenwriter
1956	Vintage Car	
