= St. Urban Tower =

Coordinates: 48°43′14.3″N 21°15′29.1″E

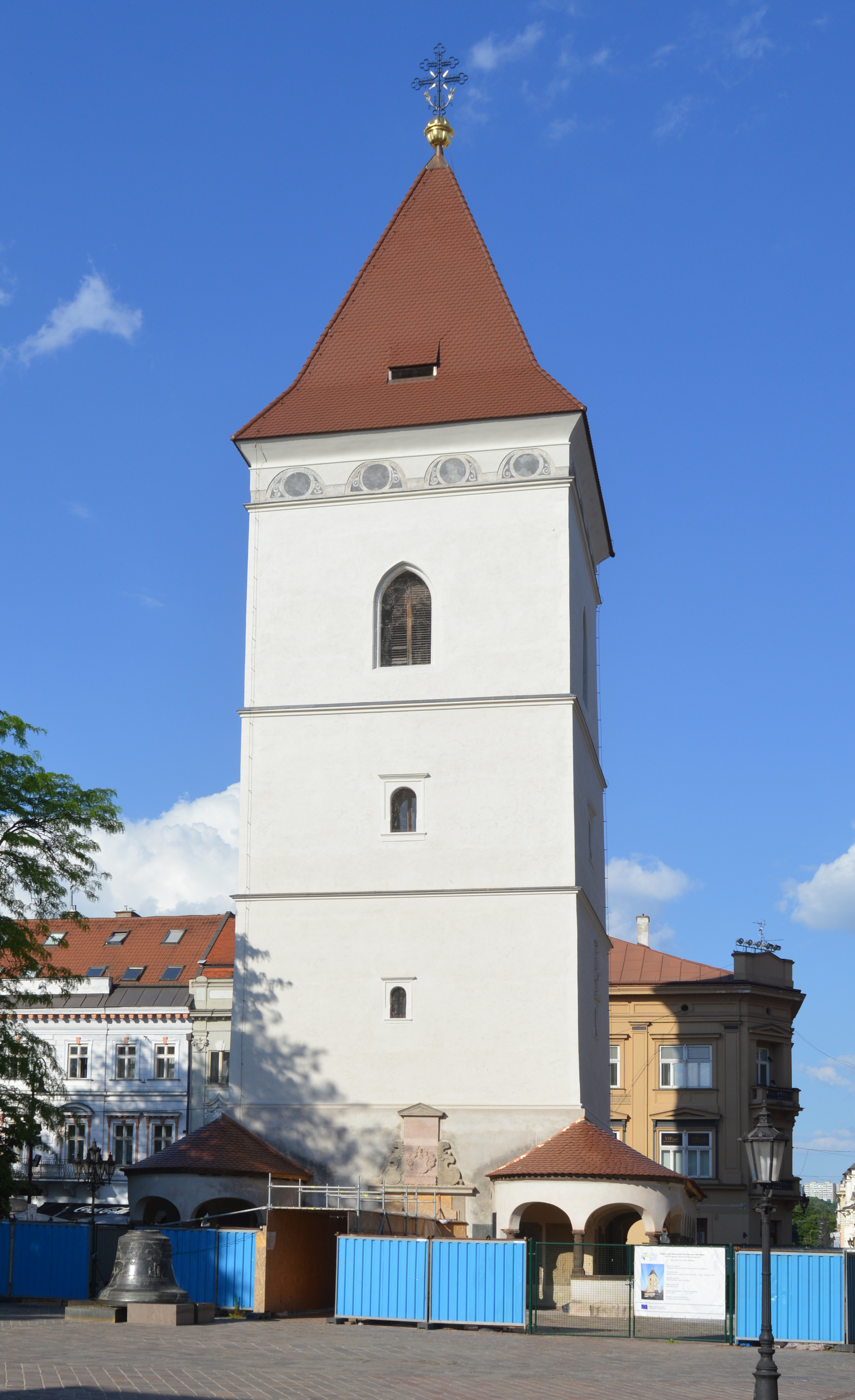
St. Urban Tower in Košice, Slovakia, 2021

The Urban Tower (Slovak: Urbanova veža) in Košice, Slovakia is a renaissance prismatic campanile with a pyramidal roof. It was erected in the 16th century.

The St. Urban Bell, a church bell installed in the tower, has been dedicated to Saint Urban, the patron of vine-dressers. The bell was cast in a mould by the bell-founder Franciscus Illenfeld of Olomouc in 1557. Its weight is seven tonnes.

In 1775 the pyramidal roof was constructed with a Baroque-style onion dome with an iron double cross. An arcade passage was erected around the tower in 1912. There are 36 old gravestones from the 14th and 15th centuries (one from the Roman Empire and dating back to the 4th century) bricked into the exterior walls of the St. Urban Tower.

In 1966 the tower was damaged by fire and the St. Urban Bell was destroyed as well. The reconstructed tower was reopened in 1971. The renovated bell was located in the front of the tower and a copy of the bell (made by employees of VSŽ Steel Works Košice in 1996) was installed in the campanile.

The East Slovak Museum set up an exhibition of foundry work in the tower after the reconstruction in 1977. It was removed in 1995. From the 2000s until the early 2010s, the tower also housed a unique wax museum exhibition in the tower, portraying historical personalities pertaining to Košice's history. Since then, the museum has closed.

== Gallery ==
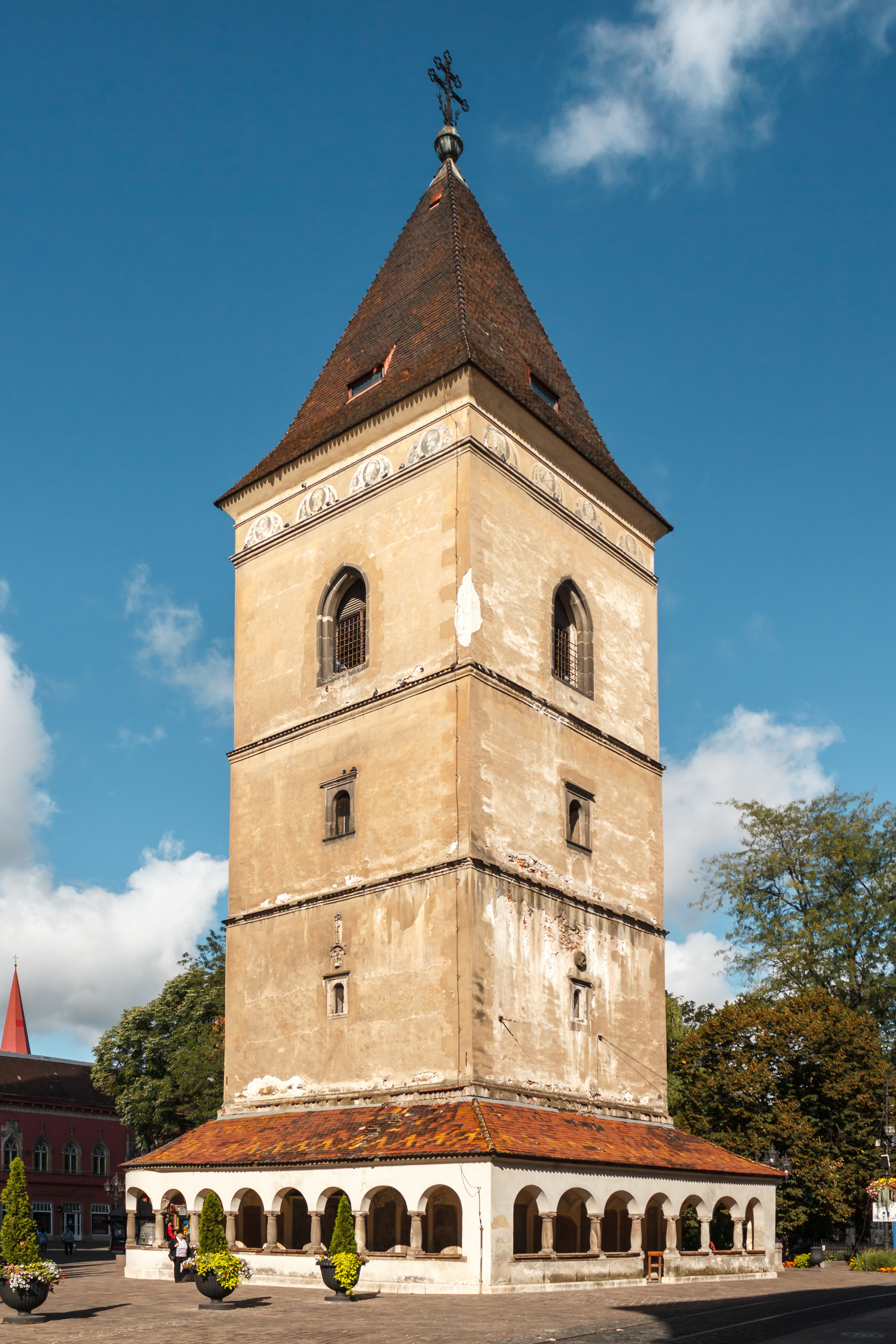
St. Urban Tower, 2017

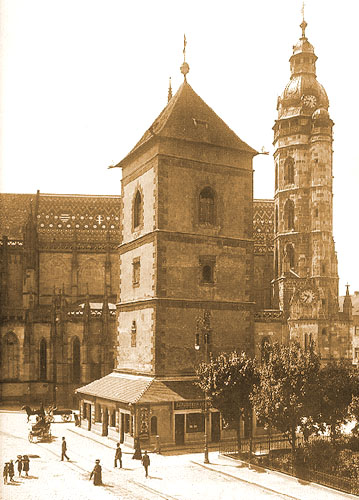
Historial view

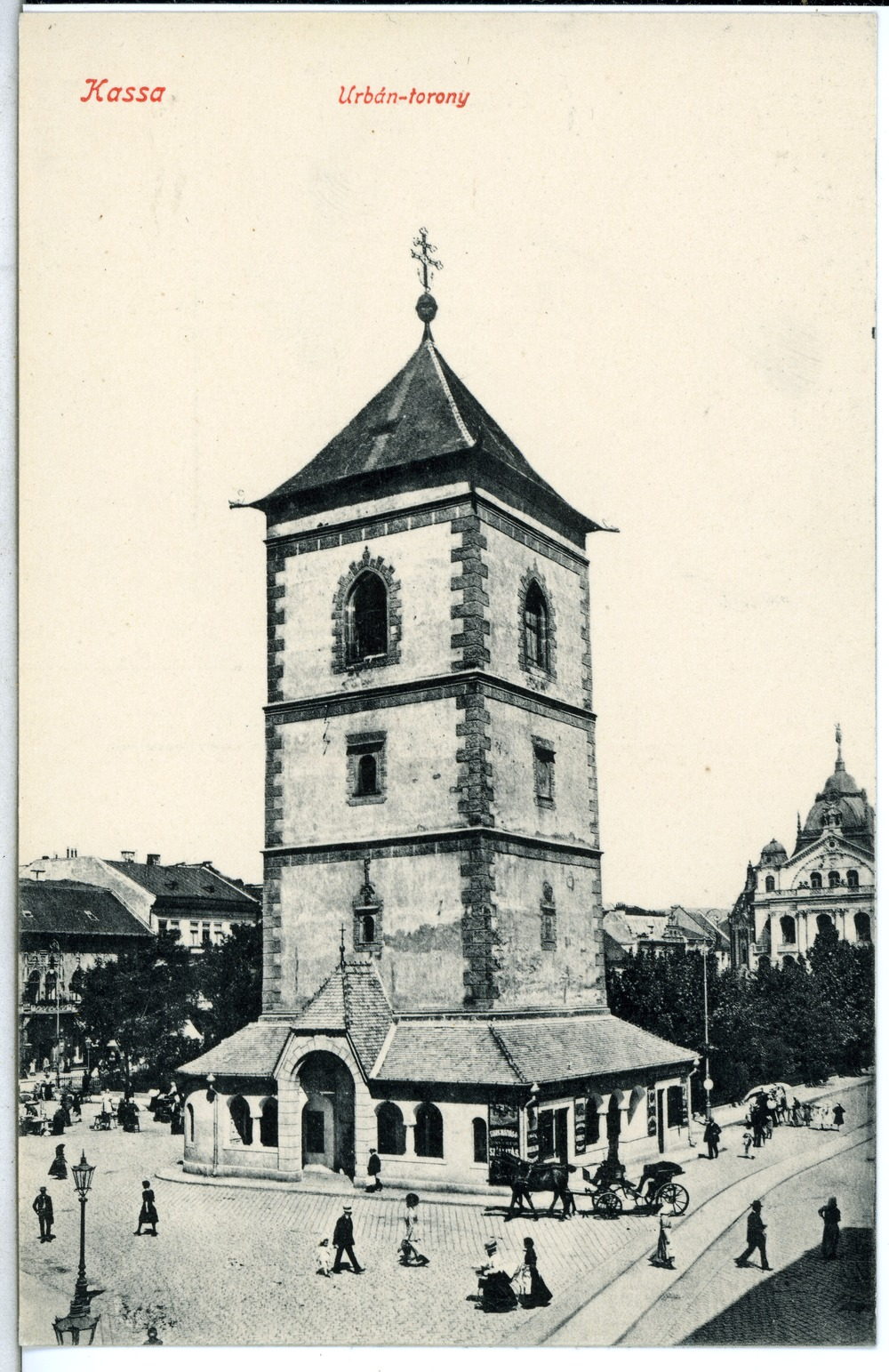
Postcard, 1912

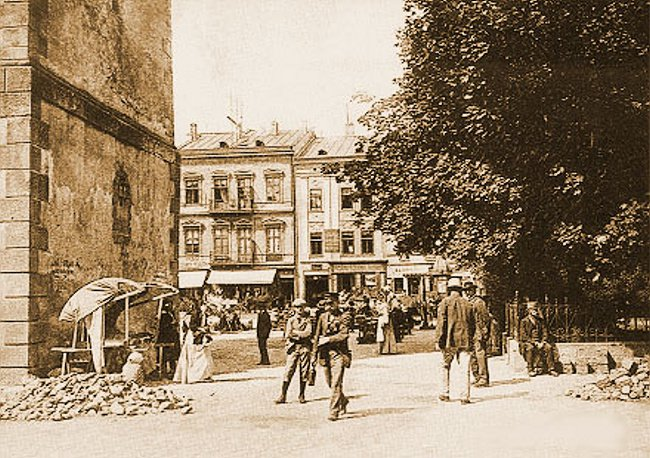
Old picture

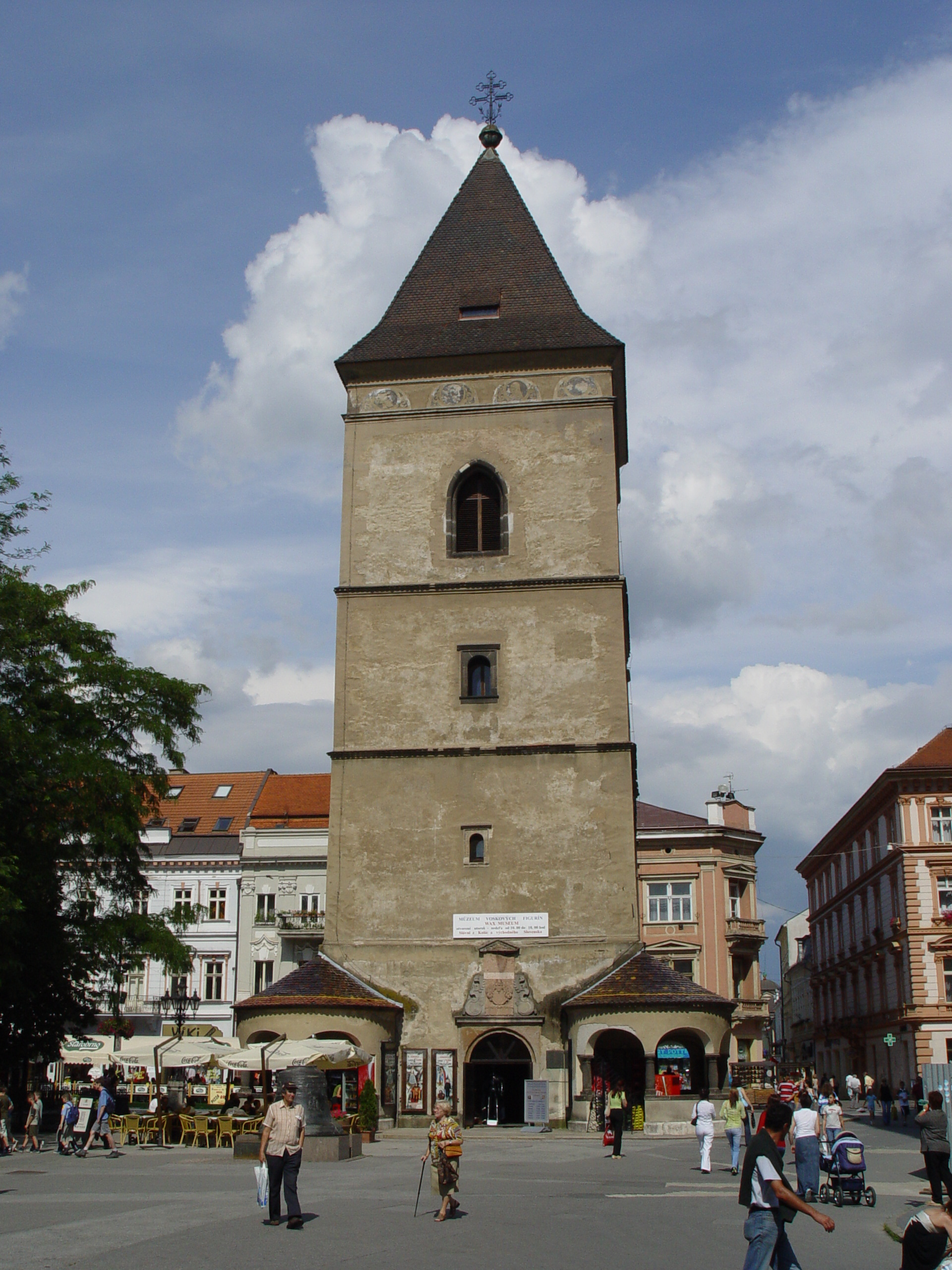
St. Urban Tower, 2005

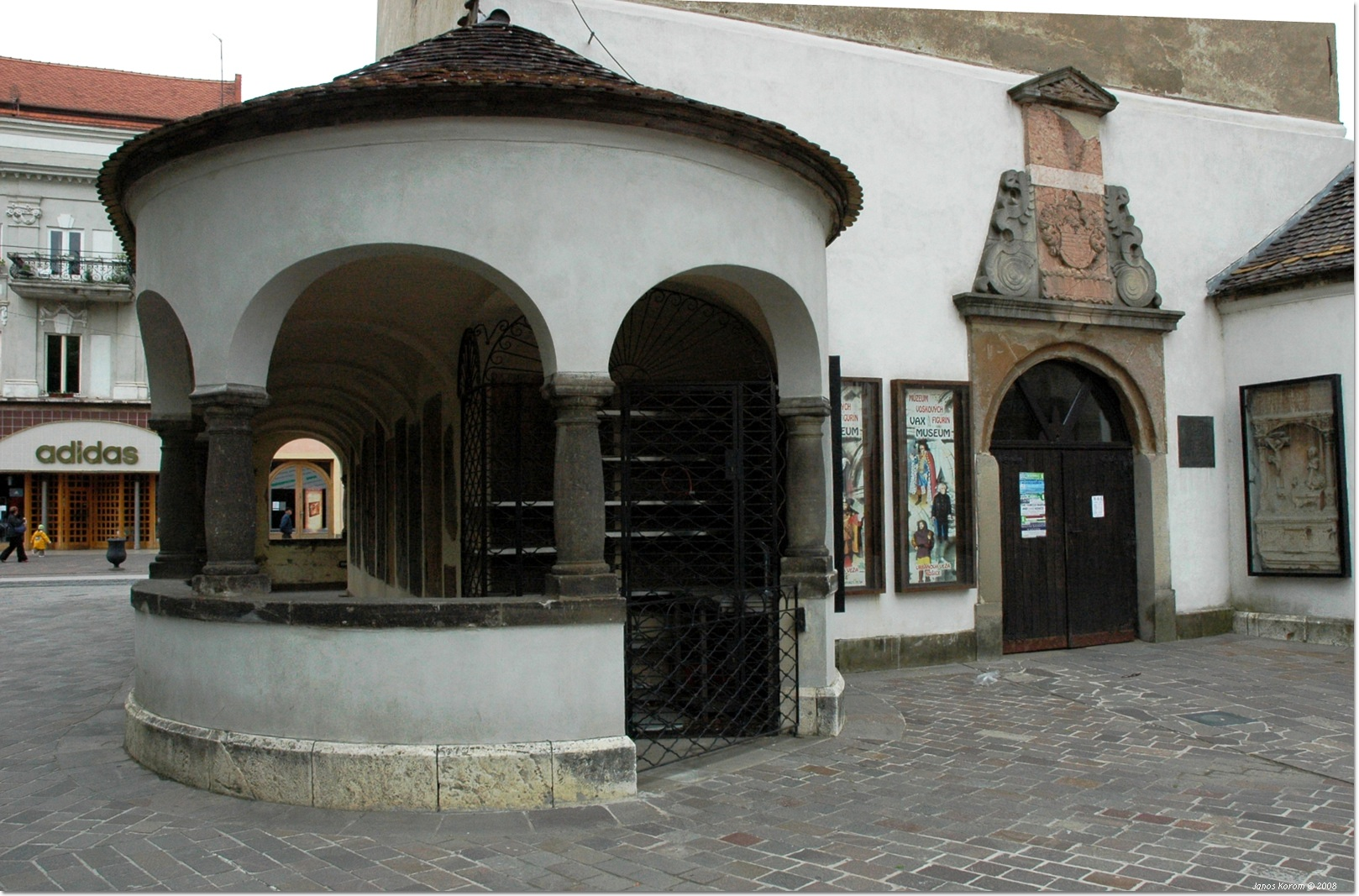
Entrance

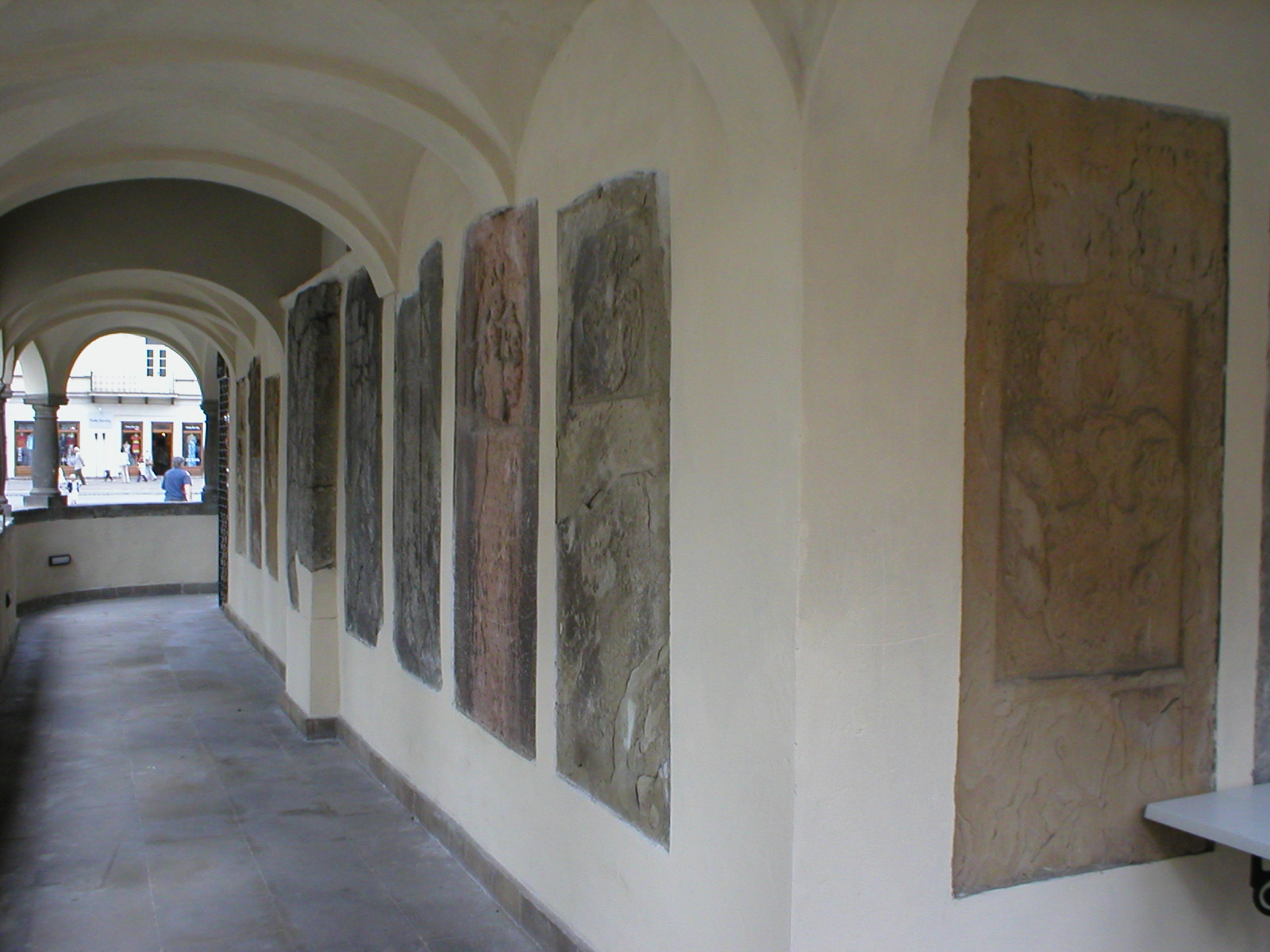
Gravestones bricked into the exterior walls of the St. Urban Tower

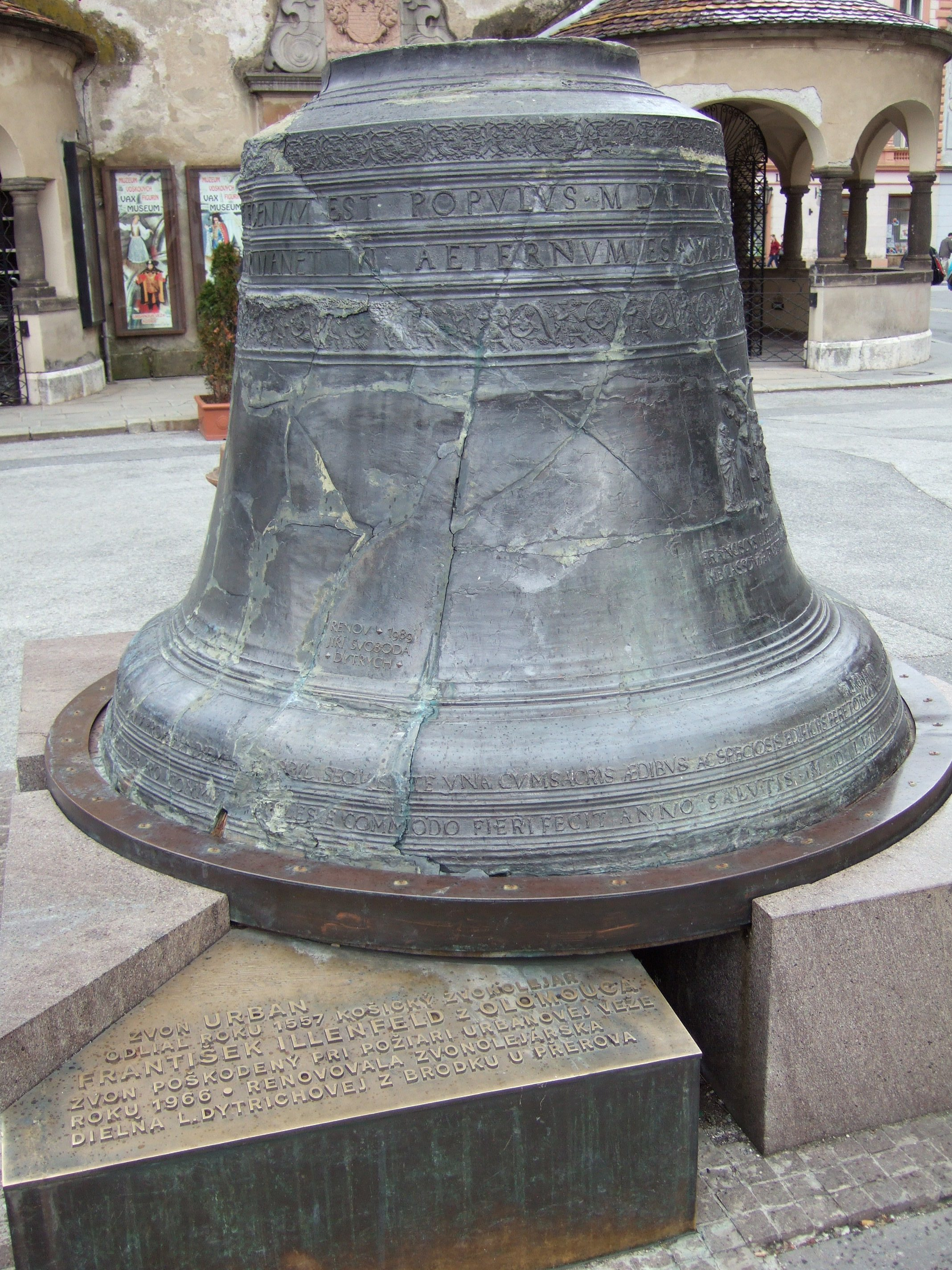
St. Urban Bell from 1557
