= Emil Radok =

Czech film director

Emil Radok (22 May 1918 in Koloděje nad Lužnicí – 7 January 1994 in Montreal) was a Czech film director. He was co-inventor of the multi-media show Laterna Magika, , which was a star attraction at the Czechoslovakia pavilion at Expo 67. In 1968 he left to exile to Canada and died there.

Probably Radok's most monumental project was the "kinetic mosaic" which he designed for the Universe of Energy pavilion at Walt Disney World's EPCOT Center theme park, which opened on 1 October 1982. Working with WED Enterprises (Walt Disney Imagineering), Radok created a pre-show film for the pavilion that was projected onto a 90-foot wide screen by five synchronized 35-mm projectors. The projection surface was composed of some 100 revolving prism-shaped modules arrayed in four horizontal rows, 25 modules in each row. Each module had two white projection surfaces and one matte black surface, each 3 ½ feet square. Each module revolved independently via its own interior servo-motor. Synchronized by computer, the modules could create one large flat screen, but were also programmed to revolve in a variety of displays, combining into patterns of triangular wedges, flat panels, and black panels, all of which was precisely coordinated with the changing film images. The rippling movement of the units gave a unique "third dimension" to the projection surface. The theater accommodated 500 spectators. Due to mechanical complications, the revolving screens were not operational until 1984, two years after the park's opening. The display, which required constant mechanical maintenance, was eventually replaced in 1996 with five conventional movie screens.

In 1987, Radok received the Canadian Special Achievement Genie Award for the film Taming of the Demons, which played primarily at Vancouver's Expo '86.

His older brother and collaborator was Alfréd Radok (1914–1976).
