= National Theatre Košice =

Coordinates: 48.7217°N 21.2573°E

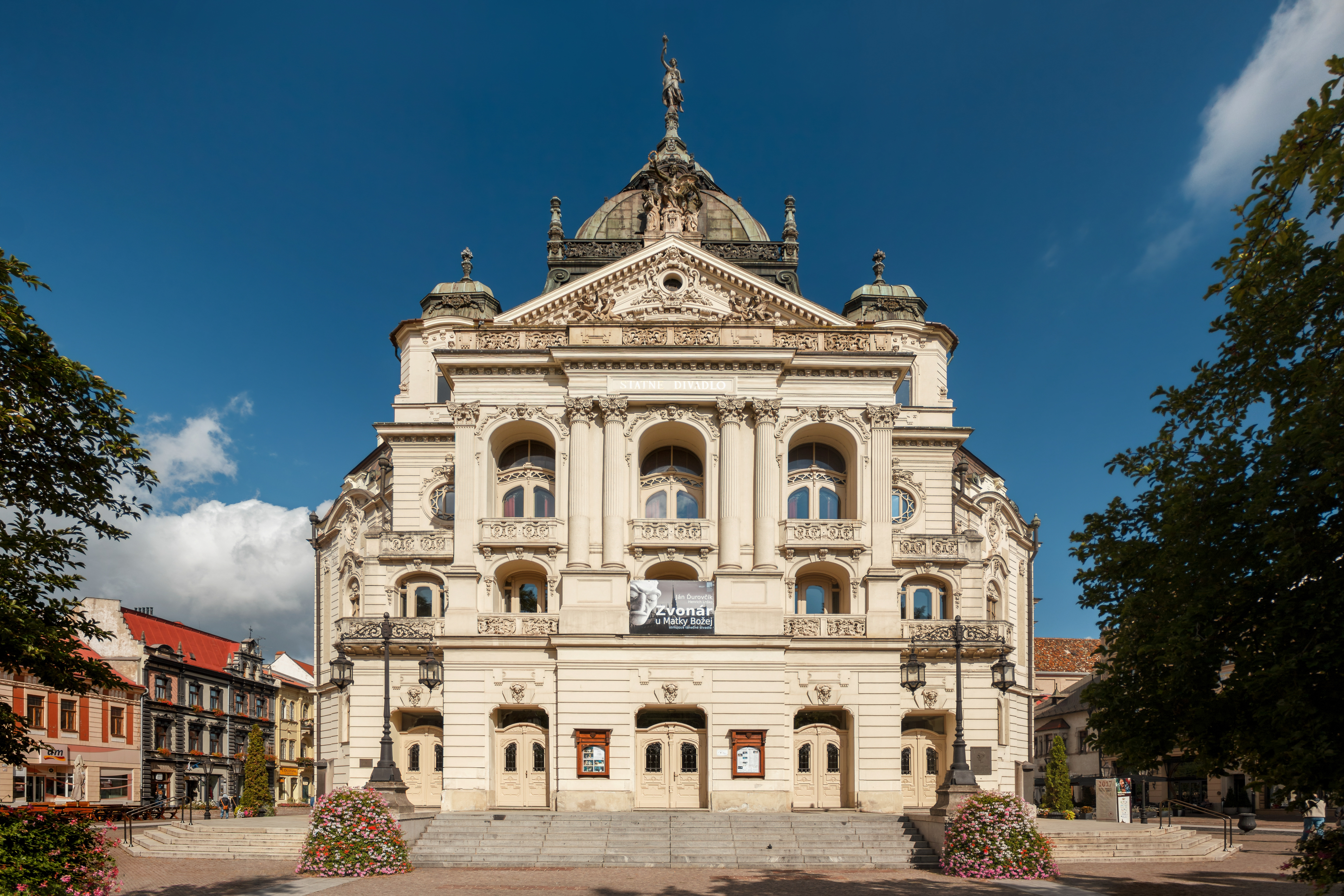
National Theatre Košice, Slovakia

The National Theatre Košice (Slovak: Národné divadlo Košice) is situated in the centre of Košice, Slovakia.

The representative building of the State Theatre was built in a Neo-baroque style according to projects of Adolf Lang during the years 1879–1899.

The interior of the theatre is richly decorated with plaster ornaments. The stage is lyre-shaped. The ceiling of the building is decorated with scenes from William Shakespeare's plays Othello, Romeo and Juliet, King Lear and A Midsummer Night's Dream.
