= Magician's Lantern =

Theatre in Prague, Czech Republic

- Laterna magika
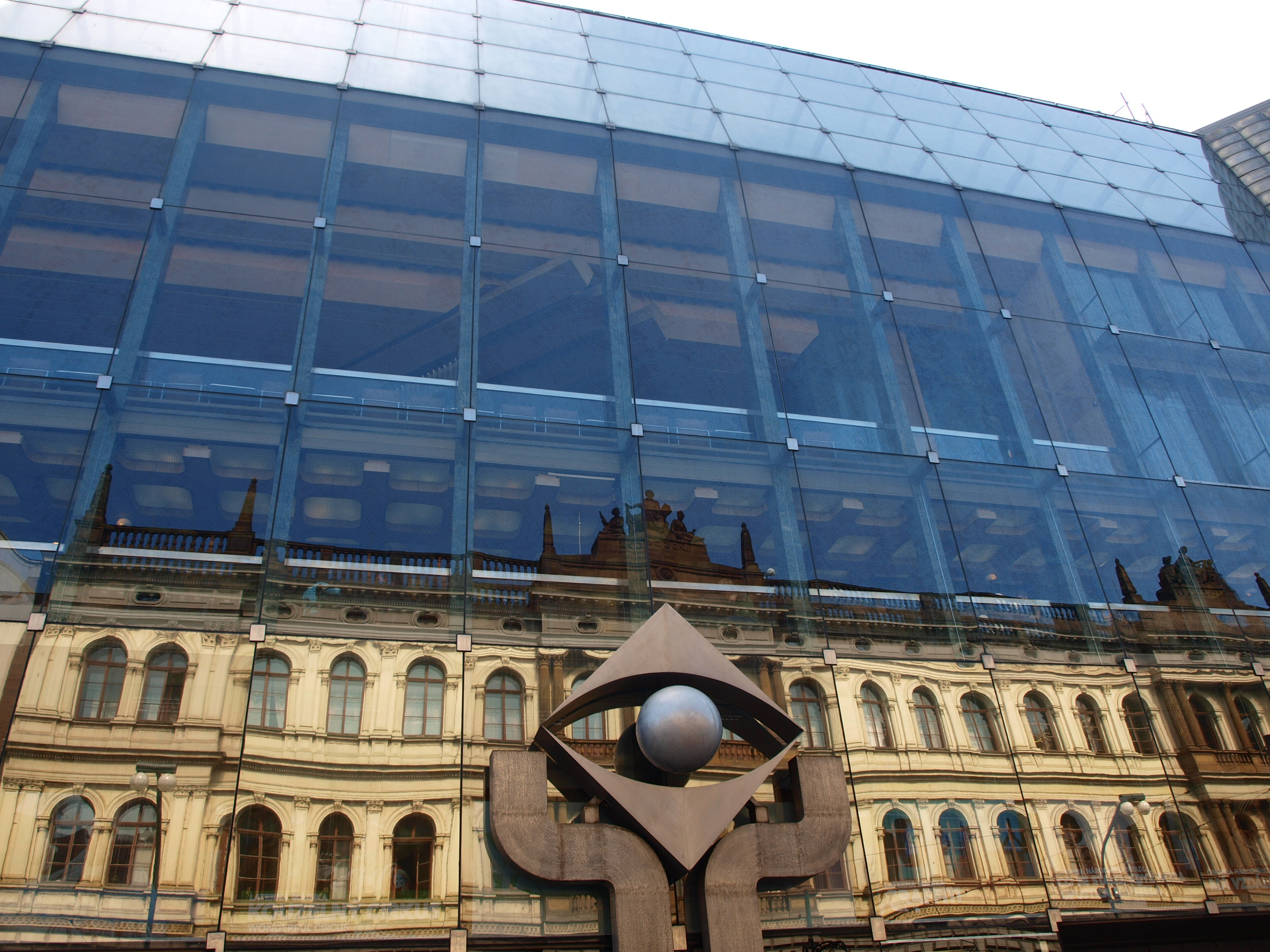
- Interactive map of Magician's Lantern
- Address: Národní 4 Prague 1 Czech Republic
- Coordinates: 50°4′52.16″N 14°24′51.73″E

Construction
- Opened: 1958

Website
- Official website

Laterna magika (Czech: Laterna magika), largely considered the world's first multimedia theatre, was founded as a cultural program at the 1958 Brussels Expo. It launched its official activity on 9 May 1959, as an independent company of the National Theatre, performing at the Adria palace in Prague. Wonderful Circus, which premiered in 1977, is the most frequently performed theatre piece in Central Europe, and has remained in the repertoire ever since. Laterna magika now is one of the ensembles of the National Theatre, based at the New Stage of the National Theatre in Prague.

Laterna magika productions blend various genres, ranging from dramatic acting through affording a dominant role to dance and ballet to mime and Black Theatre. All of their productions have been original works directly created for the company, not ready-made pieces, which, with a few exceptions, have never subsequently appeared in the repertoire of another company. The fundamental principle (interaction between film projection and live dramatic action) has been gradually supplemented with new technologies, for instance, digital projection or new media, including real-time programmable software.

== History ==
=== Expo 58 programme ===
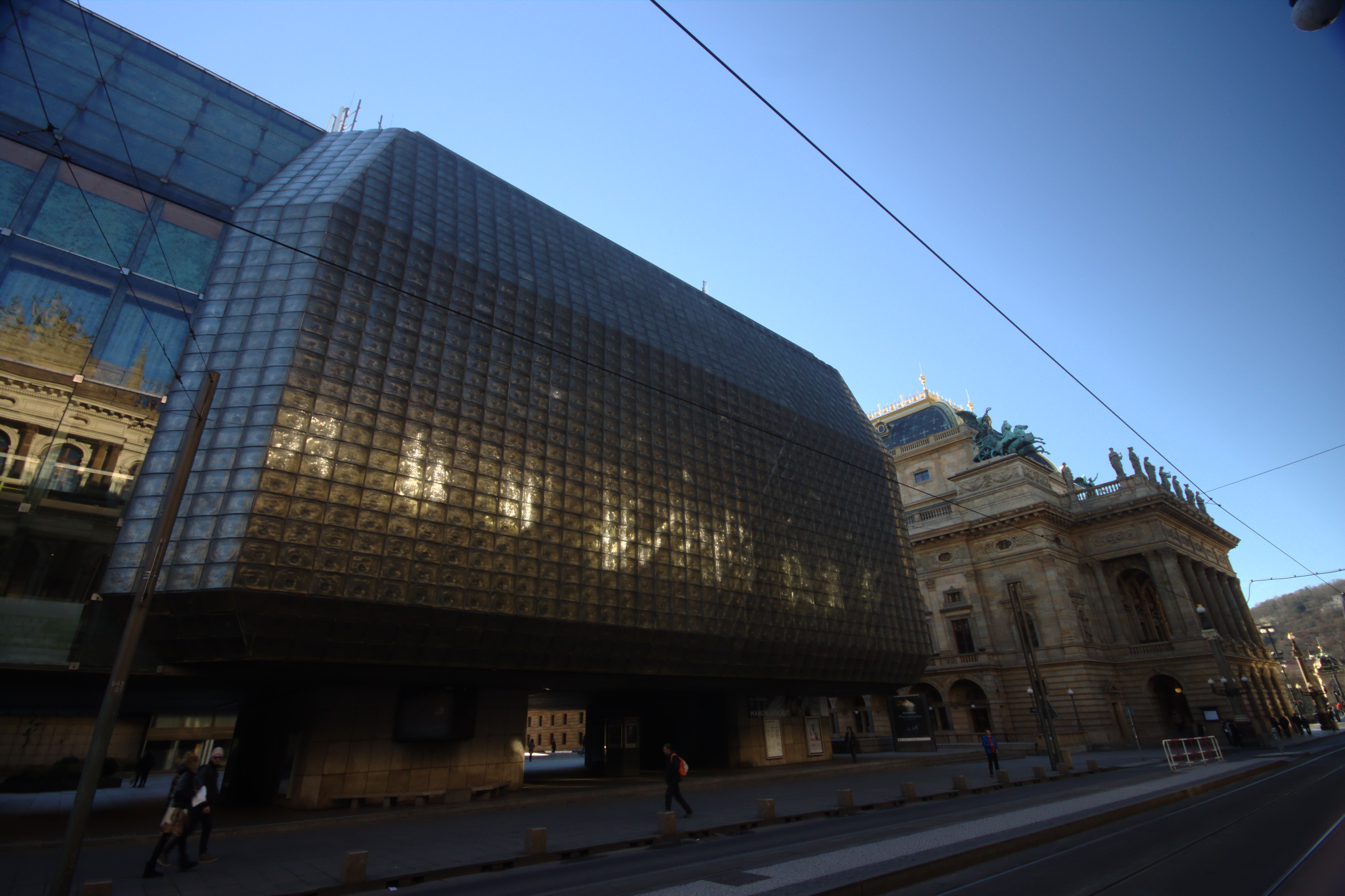
The New Stage of the National Theatre in Prague - residency of Laterna magika

Laterna magika initially came into being as a representative cultural programme devised with the aim to promote the at Expo 58, which took place from 17 April to 19 November 1958 in Brussels. The project was entrusted to the stage director Alfréd Radok and the set designer Josef Svoboda, who duly brought to fruition the idea of combining film projection and live stage performance. The other creators who participated in the project included Jaroslav Stránský (production manager and head of the staging plan), Miloš Forman (set designer), the stage directors Vladimír Svitáček and Ján Roháč, the choreographer Jiří Němeček, the costume designer Erna Veselá, the actresses Zdeňka Procházková, Sylva Daníčková and Valentina Thielová, the dancers Jarmila Manšingrová, Naďa Blažíčková, Yvetta Pešková, Eva Poslušná, Miroslav Kůra, Vlastimil Jílek, and other members of the National Theatre. The programme took the form of a mixed bill made up of individual numbers connected by a presenter's performances, which were pre-recorded in several languages and screened in a manner that came across as a seeming interaction of the actress on stage with her images and between each of these. The same principle was applied in the design of the other numbers, which made use of music, dance and live acting.

The project was given the title "Laterna magika" and was instrumental in Czechoslovakia's success at Expo 58. The pavilion attained the highest number of points and was awarded the Gold Star, received 56 other prizes and numerous diplomas and medals. At the time when the programme was presented at Expo and shortly after it had finished, Laterna magika was invited to give performances in the USSR, Syria, Egypt, the USA, England, France, the Netherlands, Belgium, Austria, Spain and Israel, while representatives of other countries were interested in possible granting of a licence. Laterna magika duly became a globally renowned trademark and following its return to it launched its official activity, on 9 May 1959, as an independent company of the National Theatre, performing at the Adria palace (on the corner of Národní and Jungmannovo náměstí) in Prague.

The programme, consisting of a variety of numbers, was above all the joint work of Alfréd Radok and Josef Svoboda, who right from the outset had defined the principles of relations between the action on stage and film, which have been developed by Laterna magika up to the present day: projection is not only a mobile backdrop, nor does it only create an appearance of reality, the key factor is the interconnection between the content of what is happening on stage and the action on the film screen. Today, Laterna magika employs a wide spectrum of media with which, with regard to its rich history, it has ample experience, thus every performance is based on a different principle of connecting the stage and the image.

=== 1959–1973 ===
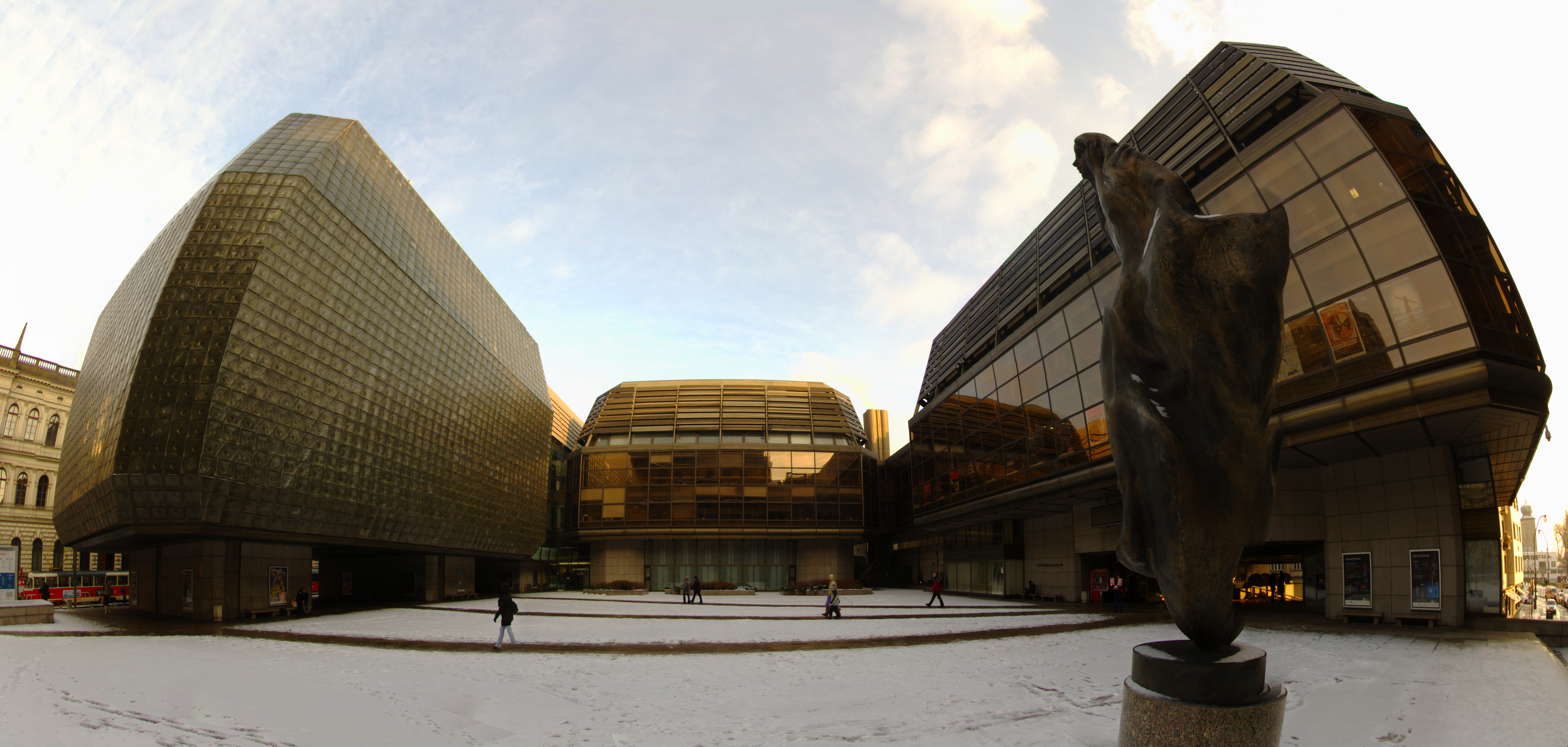
Piazzeta of the National Theatre in Prague

For a long time, the form of the first representative programme served as a model for the creation of new multimedia performances. Laterna magika was part of the National Theatre as an independent "experimental" company with its own artistic management. Its first artistic director was Alfréd Radok. In the 1960s, Laterna magika focused on both domestic and foreign audiences, increasingly centred on tour programmes, in the case of which the composite nature of the first performances was an advantage. According to archival materials and personal testimony, parts of the premiere and subsequent tour programmes were changed, supplemented, re-arranged, or the productions were given different titles.

The second Laterna magika performance was aptly called Tour Programme and was premiered on 5 December 1960 within a guest appearance in Leningrad. The creation of a new programme gave rise to a clash with the then Communist cultural cadres' notion of socialist realist art: the Minister of Culture, Václav Kopecký, did not allow a rendition on stage of the dance-film number The Opening of the Springs to Bohuslav Martinů's music. Alfréd Radok duly resigned from his post of Laterna magika's artistic director and was succeeded by the dancer and choreographer Oldřich Stodola. Amidst the more relaxed political atmosphere in 1966, the work was re-included in the repertoire, and Radok reassumed the post of the company's head. The only exception in the programme dating from this era was the feature-length drama production of The Tales of Hoffmann, created in 1963 by the stage director Václav Kašlík, who purged Jacques Offenbach's musical work of secondary motifs and concentrated the action on Hoffmann and his three loves, with the production merely featuring three lead characters, and the ballet and opera ensembles. The critics, however, panned The Tales of Hoffmann and required that Laterna magika return to a vaudeville type of programme. At Expo 67 in Montreal, the company presented a shorter programme performed up to twelve times a day which later on was staged in Prague under the title Revue from the Box.

=== 1973–1989 ===
A turning point in the dramaturgy of Laterna magika came in 1973, when the architect and set designer Josef Svoboda assumed the post of artistic director, in which he would serve for a long time to come. The company began seeking a novel artistic expression in the form of feature-length productions, whose prototype was Prague Carnival (1974), directed by Václav Kašlík and based on old legends. It was performed to acclaim for about a month, yet failed to pass the final approval process. A new version of the production was undertaken by the director Evald Schorm, who staged it under the title Love in Carnival Colours (1975).

At the time, Laterna magika also strove to address children, first with the play Lost Fairy Tale in 1975 and then, most significantly, with Wonderful Circus, premiered in 1977, which has remained in the repertoire ever since and is the most frequently performed theatre piece in Central Europe. Moreover, Wonderful Circus ushered in Laterna magika's phase as a multi-theme theatre. At the celebration marking two decades of the production's staging, Josef Svoboda said: “The whole intention was centred on a circus theme, with a panoramic moving screen bearing the cinematic image and also representing a circus big-top. This set design serves to render the entire story and principle of Laterna magika.” The production’s creators included the founder of Czech Black Theatre, Jiří Srnec, the designers Zdenek Seydl, Eva and Jan Švankmajer, the choreographers František Pokorný, Vlastimil Jílek and Karel Vrtiška, the musician Oldřich F. Korte, and other artists. At the beginning of the 1970s, Laterna magika launched permanent collaboration with the cameraman Emil Sirotek. In 2013, the cinematographic material of Wonderful Circus was digitised; to date the production has been performed more than 6,200 times.

Acclaimed too was the subsequent Snow Queen, directed by Evald Schorm and choreographed by Pavel Šmok, and premiered in 1979. Furthermore, Laterna magika experimentally presented a drama production: Antonín Máša’s Night Rehearsal (1981), directed by Evald Schorm and with Radovan Lukavský in the lead role, which was the first performance to use synchronous screening by means of television cameras. With the play, Laterna magika strove to assert that it was also a stage for Czech audiences, since at the time it was branded a theatre solely focused on tourists. In 1983, it premiered another play, The Black Monk, with Jan Kačer portraying the main character.

Laterna magika’s dramaturgy approximated the form of repertory theatre, blending entertaining and serious themes, and self-invented experimental and traditional techniques. Elements of “multimedia” theatre not only contained a combination of media and genres, they also aimed to enhance the original methods and novel staging approaches. Ever greater scope was afforded to the dance company, whose quality was increasing, most markedly from the premiere of Pragensia, Vox Clamantis (1984), a work choreographed by Marcela Benoniová.

One of the repertoire highlights at the end of the 1980s and early 1990s was Odysseus (1987), directed by Evald Schorm and choreographed by Ondrej Šoth, to music by Michael Kocáb. During the preparations, which lasted nearly three years, the production was deemed the most challenging task Laterna magika had ever undertaken. It even had two versions, with one being performed at the Palace of Culture (today’s Congress Centre) and the other intended for the newly built New Stage of the National Theatre, opened in 1983, which has been used by Laterna magika since 1984 up to the present day.

=== 1989 – 2009 ===
During the period when Laterna magika operated at the Adria Palace, for three weeks after 21 November 1989 its residence was the most closely observed place in Czechoslovakia. At the time, all of its premises were used by the Civic Forum, a new political movement founded at the Činoherní klub theatre. Laterna magika was the centre of the “Velvet Revolution”, with its management, production workers and company members mediating contact with the citizens of the entire country. Twenty-four hours a day, they registered newly established Civic Forum offices throughout Czechoslovakia, made telephone calls, attended to correspondence. Every day, the auditorium hosted press conferences attended by journalists from all over the world and the theatre was the place at which leaflets and other printed materials were produced and distributed from. Students from outside even slept at Adria.

With a short delay, the revolution resulted in a great change to the statute of Laterna magika: in 1992 it became an independent organisation partly financed from the public purse. It continued to pursue the set programming and artistic line. The 1990 performance for three dancers Minotaur, based on representation of Friedrich Dürrenmatt’s eponymous short story (translated by Jiří Honzík), was the first to employ computer animation.

In the wake of the revolution, Laterna magika also launched collaboration with foreign stages, with the first instance being the 1992 co-production A Play About The Magic Flute (premiered in Anacapri, Italy). For the next three years, the ballet company was led by the French choreographer Jean-Pierre Aviotte, whose debut work for Laterna magika was Casanova (1995), directed by Juraj Jakubisko, followed by the critically acclaimed Puzzles.

Laterna magika ever increasingly embraced the modern and contemporary dance style, with the tendency culminating in the mixed bill Graffiti (2002), which was undertaken by the young choreographers Petr Zuska, today’s artistic director of the Czech National Ballet, Václav Kuneš, a dancer of the Nederlands Dans Theater and founder of the Prague-based 420PEOPLE, and Jiří Bubeníček, a celebrated soloist of the Hamburg Ballet and other companies, as well as a renowned choreographer. For their performance in Petr Zuska’s choreography Les Bras de Mer, the Laterna magika soloists Eva Horáková and Pavel Knolle received the Best Solo Dance Duo award for 2002 from the Dance Association of the Czech Republic, the Dance Art Union of the Slovak Republic and the Czech and Slovak Literary Fund, and were nominated for the prestigious Thalia Prize. Graffiti was also the last work of the set designer Josef Svoboda, who died in 2002. He employed in it his invention of the virtual screen, allowing for projecting images in front of the stage, first applied in the 1999 ballet The Trap.

In 2004, Laterna magika created the production Argonauts to commission for the Greek Olympic Committee. Choreographed by Jan Kodet, it was premiered on the eve of the Summer Olympic Games in Athens. The following year, the co-production with ’s Rendez-vous, choreographed by Jean-Pierre Aviotte, was first performed in Avignon. In 2008, Laterna magika celebrated its 50th anniversary with the production Cocktail 008, made up of extracts from its best repertoire works, and supplemented with a bonus in the form of the short retro revue Code 58.08, which was created to mark the anniversary of Expo 58 and premiered under the title The Brussels Dream in May 2008.

=== The present ===
In 2010, Laterna magika was reintegrated in the National Theatre. From 1 January 2010 to 31 December 2011, it operated as the National Theatre’s fourth company, headed by its artistic director, Zdeněk Prokeš, and on 1 January it became a section of the New Stage of the National Theatre. The spring of 2011 saw the premiere of the production Legends of Magic Prague, directed by Jiří Srnec and choreographed by Petr Zuska, in which Laterna magika returned to its artistic legacy: the traditional combination of theatre with film and dance. In the 2011/12 season, the production Wonderful Circus celebrated its 35th birthday and Cocktail 008 was transformed into the new retro show Cocktail 012 – The Best Of. The mixed bill was modified and the oldest repertoire pieces served as the basis for the reconstruction of the legendary The Breakneck Ride, a sequence from the 1966 piece “Variations”.

Under the heading of the New Stage, in the 2012/13 season Laterna magika premiered two titles. The first of them, a short family show As Far As I See, directed by Maria Procházková, the fruit of collaboration with several drama actors, is intended for the youngest audiences and schools, and has also been performed in a version interpreted into sign language. In March 2013, the New Stage hosted the premiere of the experimental production Anticodes, inspired by Václav Havel’s eponymous 1960s visual poetry and directed by Braňo Mazúch. The major principle applied in the production by the multimedia artist Dan Gregor, the sound designer Stanislav Abrahám and the choreographer Věra Ondrašíková was real-time tracking, detecting people and objects in pre-determined zones.

In the 2013/14 season, Laterna magika premiered the critically acclaimed multimedia project Human Locomotion, depicting episodes from the life of the famous British photographer and inventor Eadweard Muybridge. The production was created by the SKUTR tandem (the stage directors Martin Kukučka and Lukáš Trpišovský) and other seasoned artists, including the set designer Jakub Kopecký, the choreographer Jan Kodet and the composer Petr Kaláb. In the 2014/2015 season, the Extraordinary Voyages of Jules Verne enriched the repertory of performances for the whole family. In the 2015/2016 season, Laterna magika premiered The Little Prince, adaptation of one on the most famous books of the 20th century. The last two performances combine drama, dance and projections and are popular among families.

In 2017 Laterna magika presented a new project in the scope of "LaternaLAB", where emerging artist can present their view of Laterna magika and its artistic future. The project CUBE was created by the members of the company themselves: Pavel Knolle as director, David Stránský and Štěpán Pechar as choreographers. After winning the 1st prize at the 2019 BABEL Fast International Theatre Festival, Cube has received the Honourable Mention for Video mapping and projections from the biennial national competition of contemporary dance art Ballet 2019. The same team built a new group of collaborators around a new topic, won a competition for celebrating 60 years of Laterna magika and created a performance The Garden in 2018. In 2020, Laterna magika premiered a Bon Appétit! in the choreography of Jan Kodet and under direction of SKUTR (Martin Kukučka and Lukáš Trpišovský), joint project of Laterna magika and Czech National Ballet dancers who worked together for the first time ever.

From January 2021 on, Radim Vizváry, mime, director and choreographer, was appointed artistic director of Laterna magika ensemble.

== Laterna magika premieres ==
Title	Premiere
Expo 58	26 May 1958
Expo 58	9 May 1959
Laterna magika II / Tour Programme	Leningrad, 5 December 1960
The Tales of Hoffmann	4 September 1962
Variations	9 June 1963
Variations 66	27 May 1966
Expo 67	Montreal, April – October 1967
Revue from the Box	25 March 1968
Prague Carnival	30 May 1974
Love in Carnival Colours	10 April 1975
Lost Fairy Tale	10 October 1975
Wonderful Circus	15 April 1977
Snow Queen	27 September 1979
Night Rehearsal	5 February 1981
One Day in Prague	28 October 1982
The Black Monk	3 November 1983
The Garrulous Slug	10 February 1984
Pragensia, Vox Clamantis	20 December 1984
Orbis pictus	11 September 1986
Vivisection	3 March 1987
Odysseus	10 September 1987
Minotaur	15 February 1990
A Play About The Magic Flute	11 September 1992
Odysseus (the New Stage version)	6 April 1993
Casanova	9 February 1995
Puzzles	14 December 1996
The Trap	17 September 1999
Graffiti	17 December 2001
Argonauts	8 August 2004
Rendez-vous	2 August 2005
Cocktail 008	10 October 2008
Legends of Magic Prague	3 March 2011
Cocktail 012 – The Best of	1 March 2012
As Far As I See	14 February 2013
Anticodes	21 March 2013
Human Locomotion	6 February 2014
Extraordinary Voyages of Jules Verne	19 February 2015
The Little Prince	1 April 2016
Cube	23 March 2017
The Garden	20 December 2018
Bon Appétit!	10 September 2020
