= Calvinist Church at Hrnčiarska Street =

Church building in Košice, Slovakia

Coordinates: 48.7210°N 21.2611°E

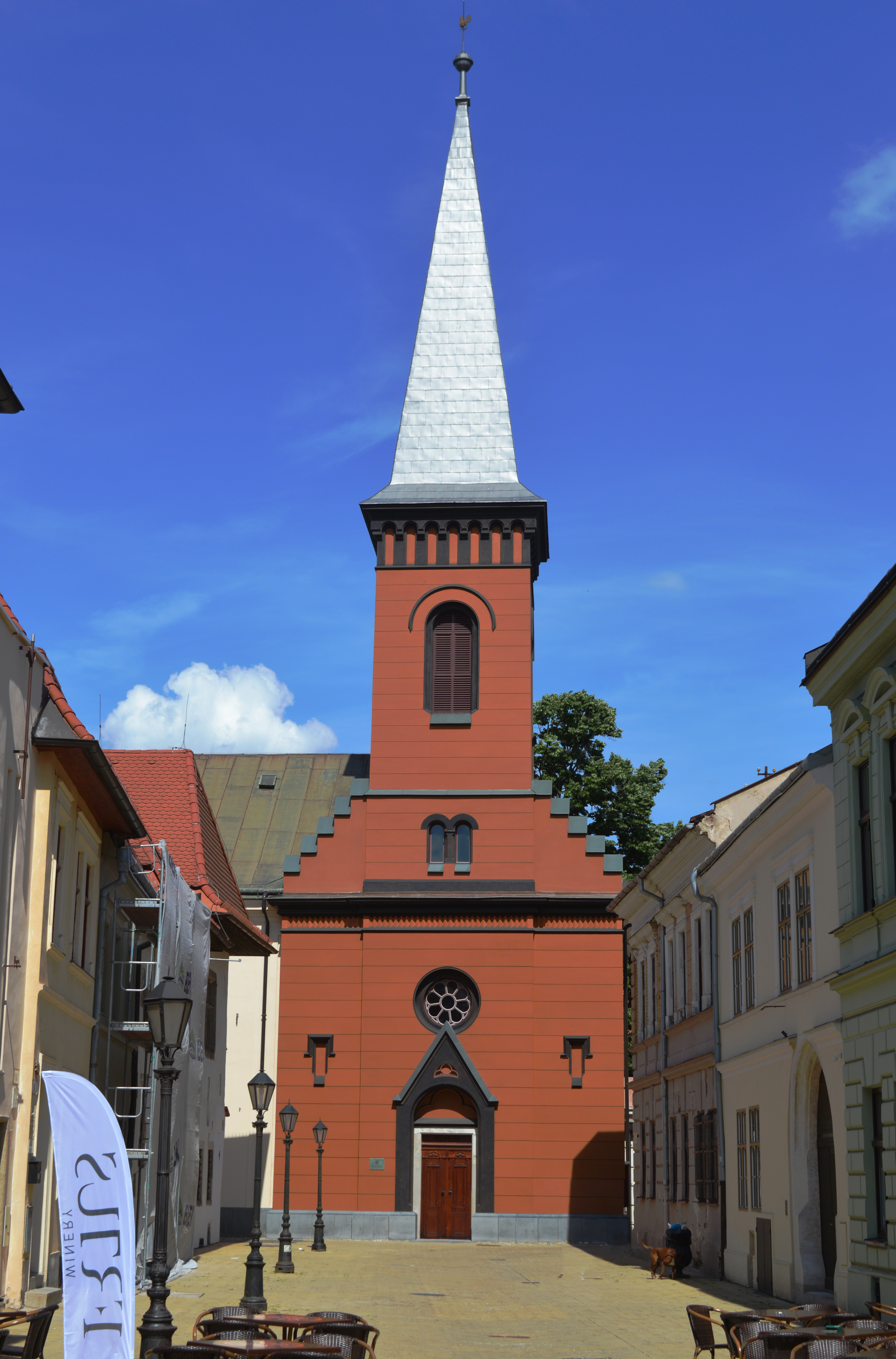
The Calvinist Church, June 2021

The Calvinist Church (Slovak: Kalvínsky kostol) at Hrnčiarska ulica (English: Pottery Street) in Košice, Slovakia was initially an army store-house.

In the years 1805–11 it was rebuilt to a Calvinist church with a new 48-metre slender spire. The church interior is very simple, the only presentable piece is the pulpit. A metal rooster made in 1589 was given on the spire. Initially it was installed on the northern tower of the St. Elisabeth Cathedral.

== Gallery ==
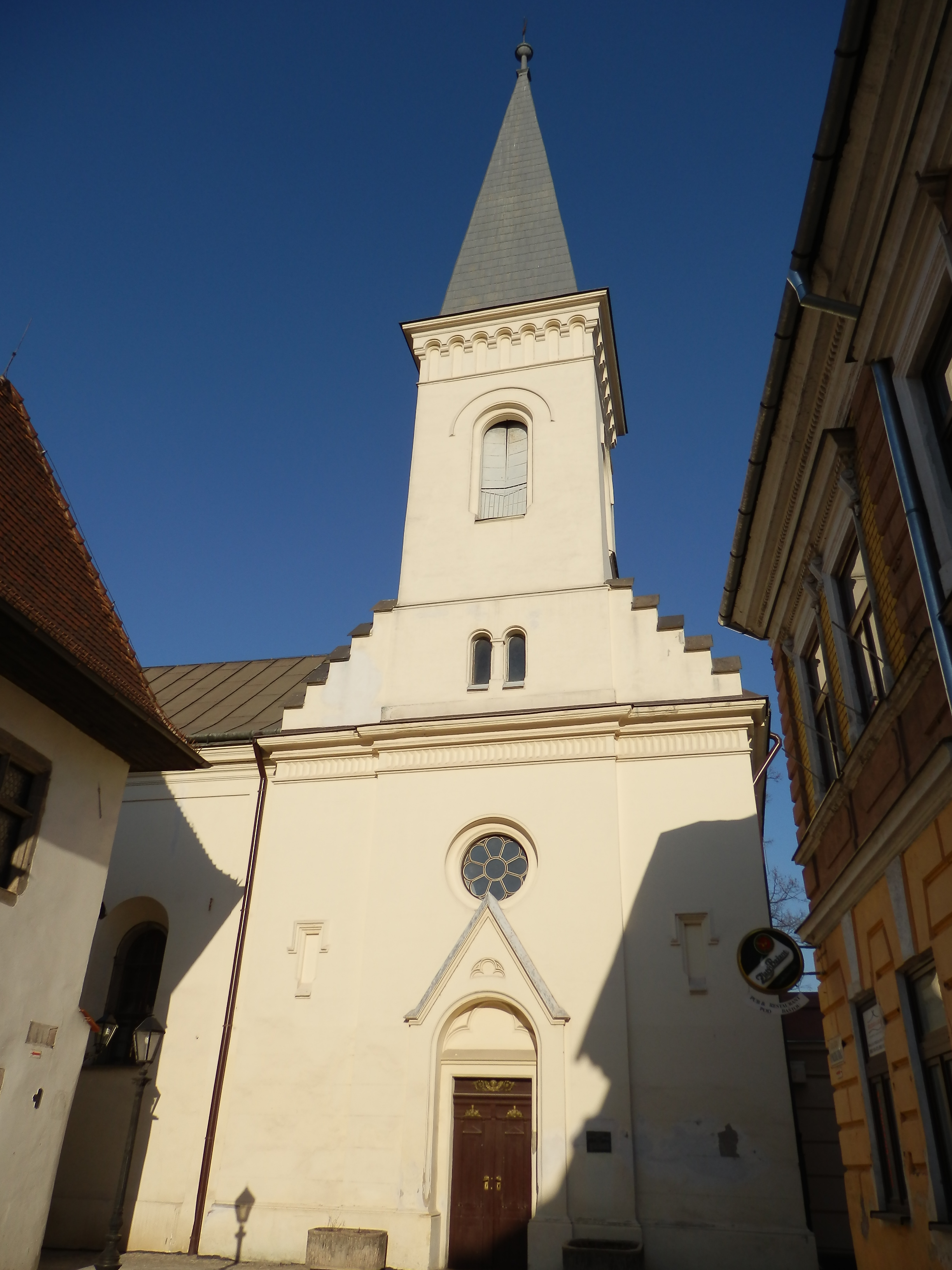
Calvinist Church before reconstruction

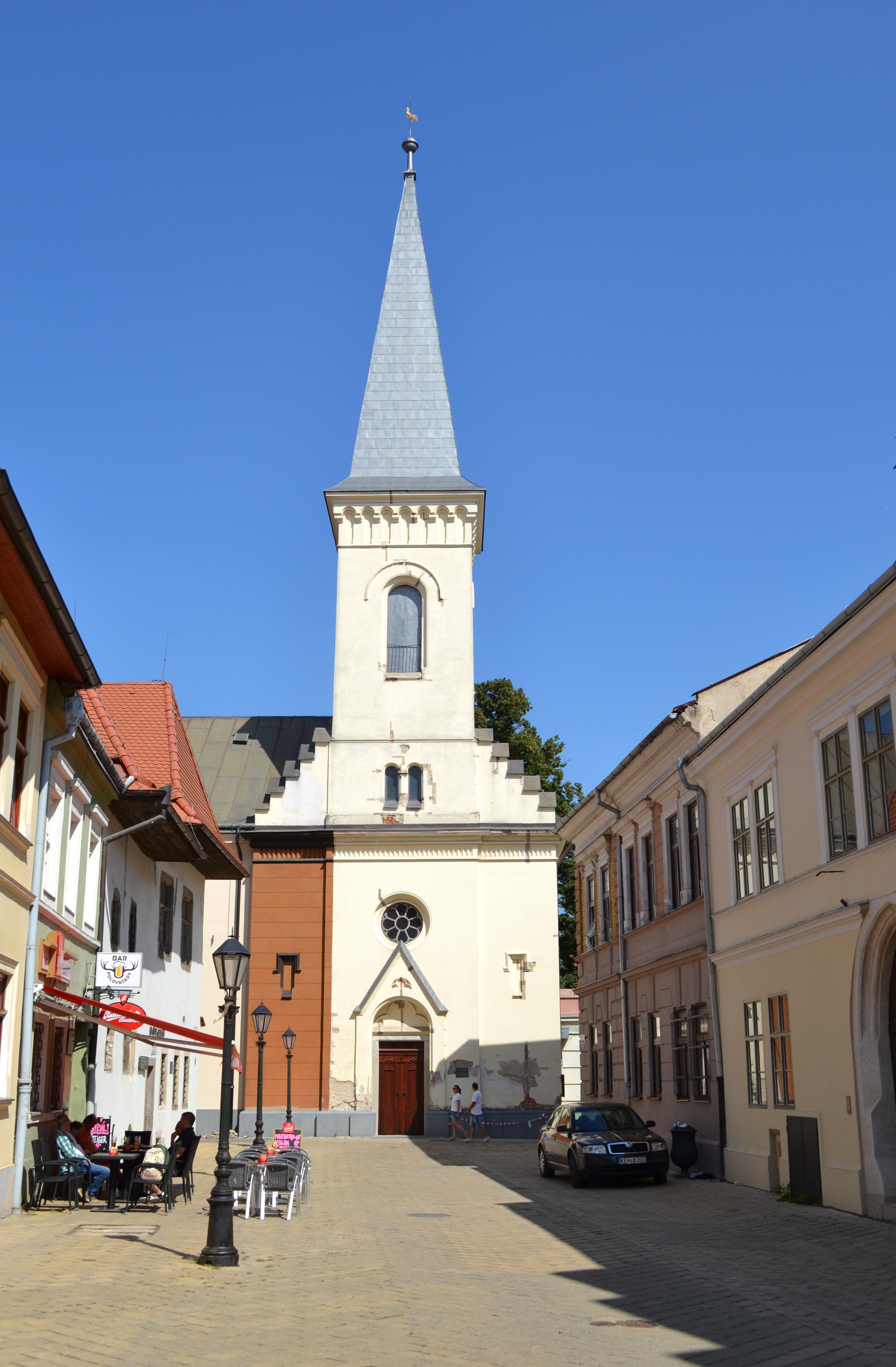
Calvinist Church during reconstruction

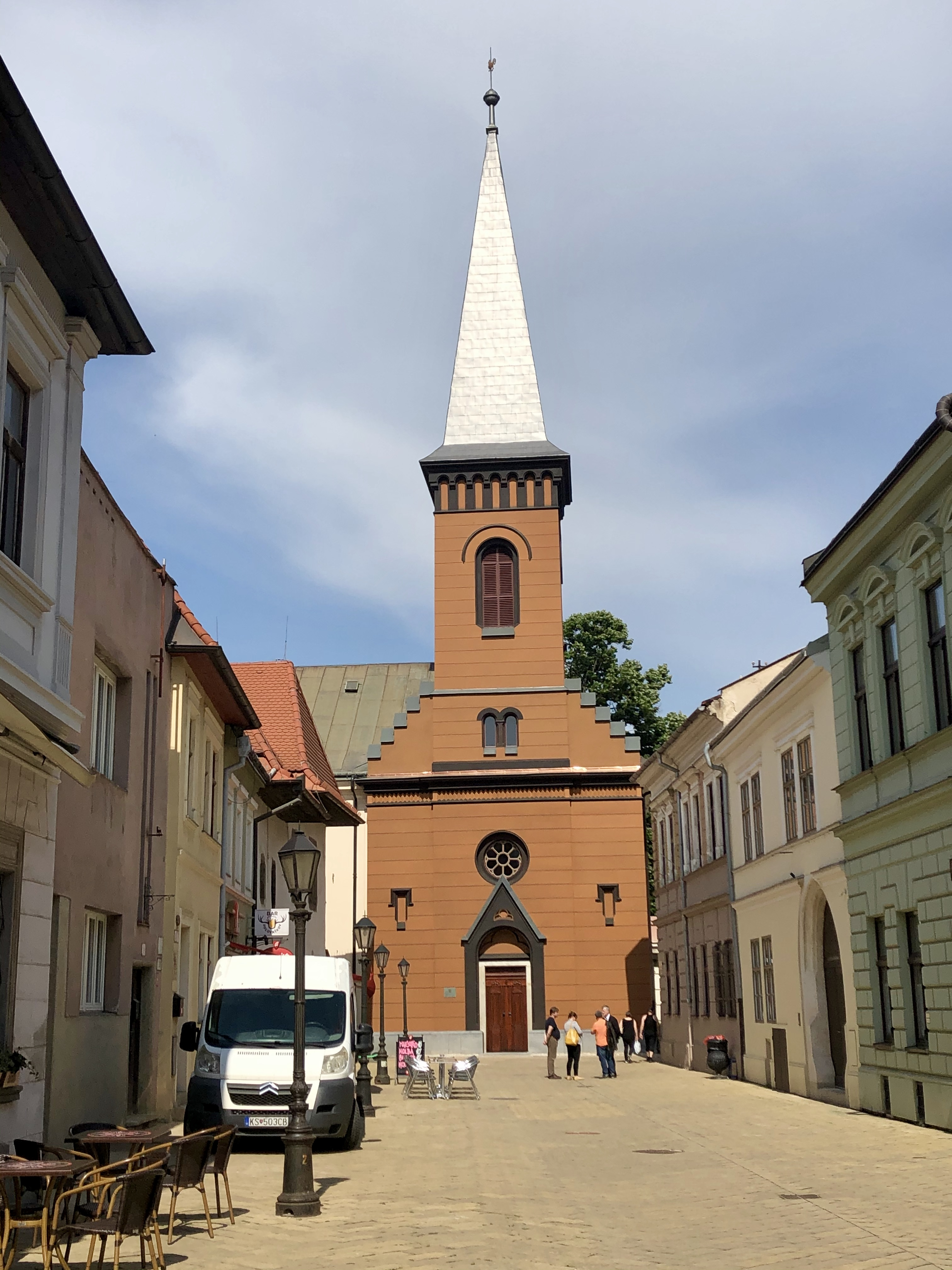
Calvinist Church 2020
