= 1775 =

1775 in various calendars
- Gregorian calendar: 1775; MDCCLXXV
- Ab urbe condita: 2528
- Armenian calendar: 1224; ԹՎ ՌՄԻԴ
- Assyrian calendar: 6525
- Balinese saka calendar: 1696–1697
- Bengali calendar: 1181–1182
- Berber calendar: 2725
- British Regnal year: 15 Geo. 3 – 16 Geo. 3
- Buddhist calendar: 2319
- Burmese calendar: 1137
- Byzantine calendar: 7283–7284
- Chinese calendar: 甲午年 (Wood Horse); 4472 or 4265 — to — 乙未年 (Wood Goat); 4473 or 4266
- Coptic calendar: 1491–1492
- Discordian calendar: 2941
- Ethiopian calendar: 1767–1768
- Hebrew calendar: 5535–5536
- Hindu calendars
- Vikram Samvat: 1831–1832
- Shaka Samvat: 1696–1697
- Kali Yuga: 4875–4876
- Holocene calendar: 11775
- Igbo calendar: 775–776
- Iranian calendar: 1153–1154
- Islamic calendar: 1188–1189
- Japanese calendar: An'ei 4 (安永４年)
- Javanese calendar: 1700–1701
- Julian calendar: Gregorian minus 11 days
- Korean calendar: 4108
- Minguo calendar: 137 before ROC 民前137年
- Nanakshahi calendar: 307
- Thai solar calendar: 2317–2318
- Tibetan calendar: ཤིང་ཕོ་རྟ་ལོ་ (male Wood-Horse); 1901 or 1520 or 748 — to — ཤིང་མོ་ལུག་ལོ་ (female Wood-Sheep); 1902 or 1521 or 749

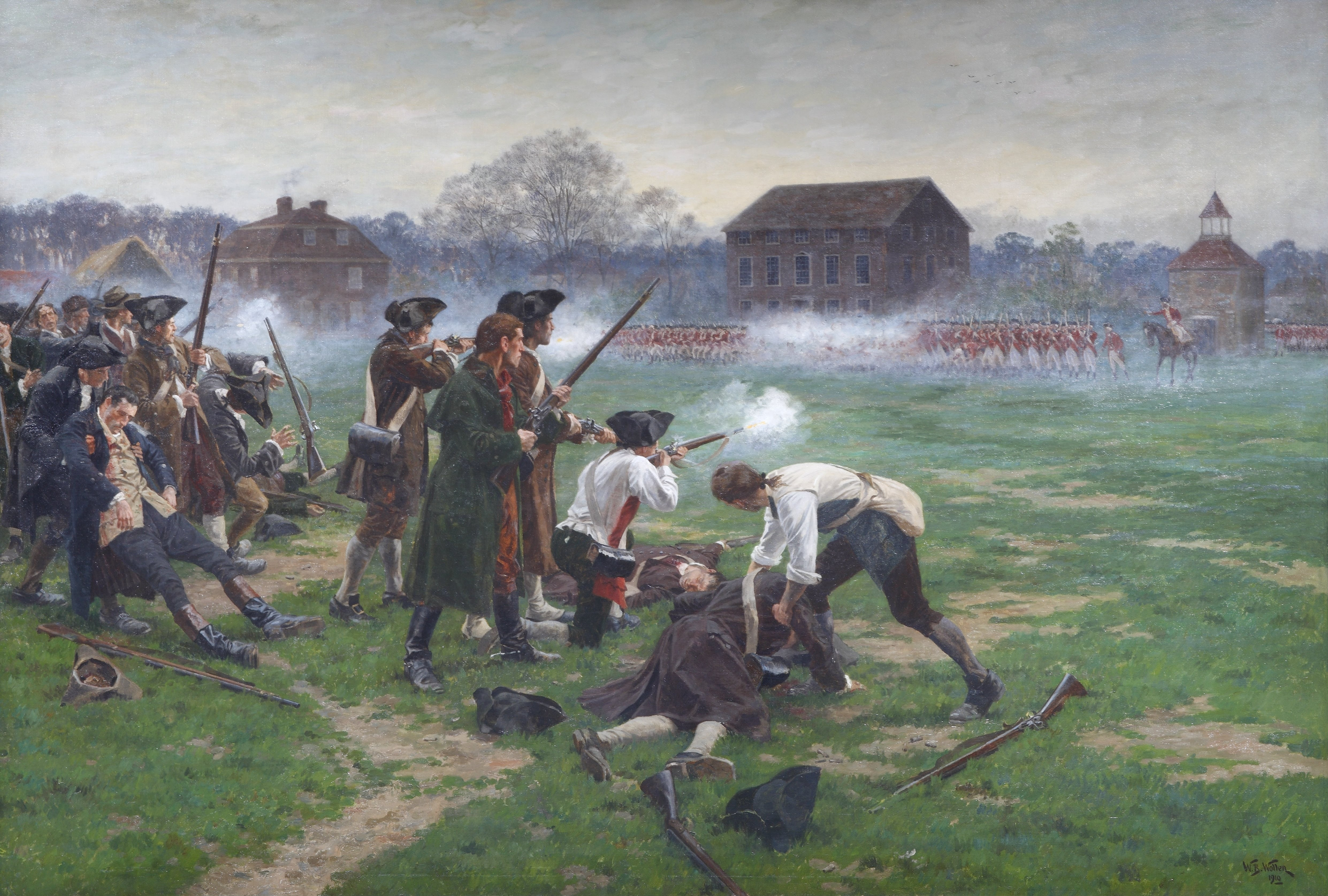
April 19: Battles of Lexington and Concord

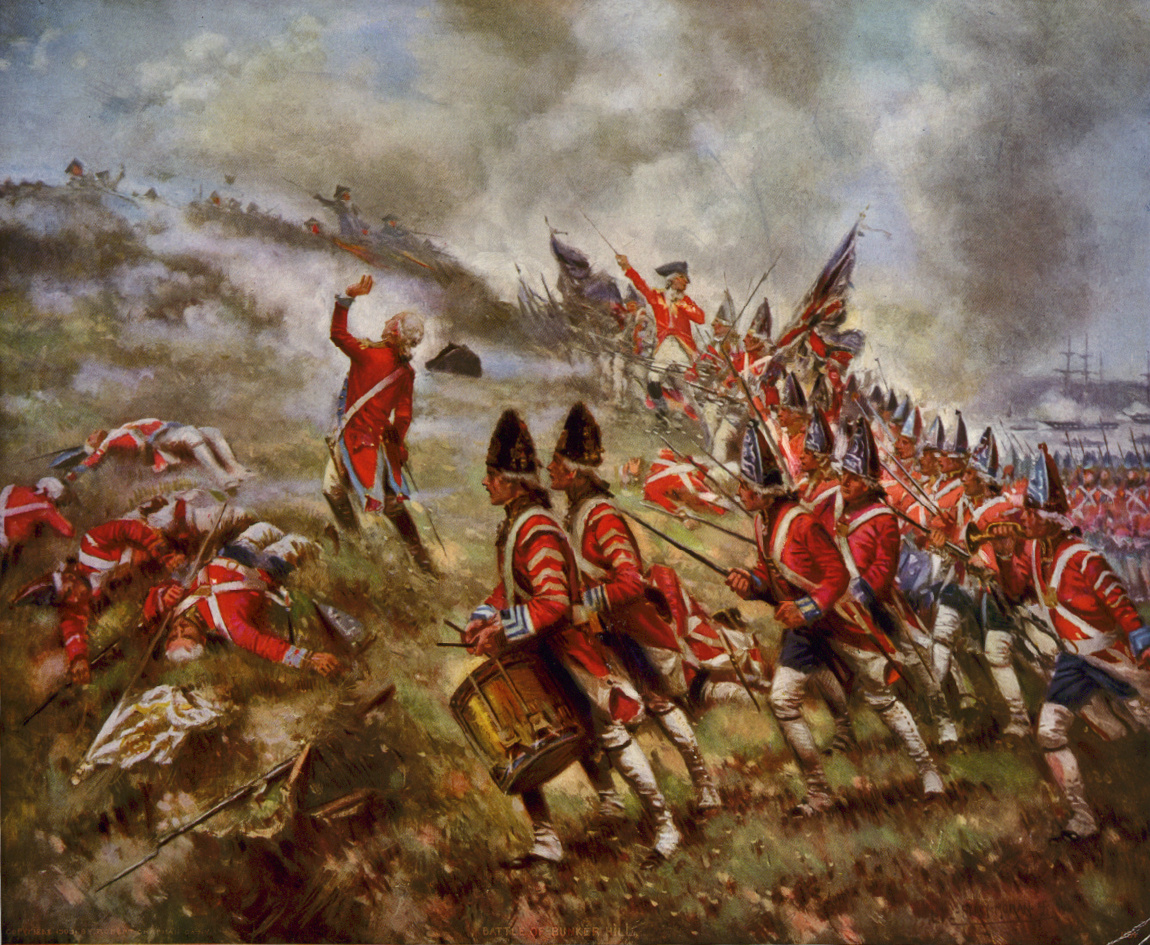
June 17: Battle of Bunker Hill

1775 (MDCCLXXV) was a common year starting on Sunday of the Gregorian calendar and a common year starting on Thursday of the Julian calendar, the 1775th year of the Common Era (CE) and Anno Domini (AD) designations, the 775th year of the 2nd millennium, the 75th year of the 18th century, and the 6th year of the 1770s decade. As of the start of 1775, the Gregorian calendar was 11 days ahead of the Julian calendar, which remained in localized use until 1923.

== Events ==
=== Summary ===
The American Revolutionary War began this year, with the first military engagement on April 19 Battles of Lexington and Concord on the day after Paul Revere's ride. The Second Continental Congress took various steps toward organizing an American government, appointing George Washington commander-in-chief (June 14), Benjamin Franklin postmaster general (July 26) and creating a Continental Navy (October 13) and a Marine force (November 10) as landing troops for it, but as yet the 13 colonies have not declared independence, and both the British (June 12) and American (July 15) governments make laws. On July 6, Congress issues the Declaration of the Causes and Necessity of Taking Up Arms and on August 23, King George III of Great Britain declares the American colonies in rebellion, announcing it to Parliament on November 10. On June 17, two months into the colonial siege of Boston, at the Battle of Bunker Hill, just north of Boston, British forces are victorious, but only after suffering severe casualties and after Colonial forces run out of ammunition, Fort Ticonderoga is taken by American forces in New York Colony's northern frontier, and American forces unsuccessfully invade Canada, with an attack on Montreal defeated by British forces on November 13 and an attack on Quebec repulsed December 31.

Human knowledge and mastery over nature advanced when James Watt built a successful prototype of a steam engine, and a scientific expedition continued as Captain James Cook claims the South Georgia and South Sandwich Islands in the south Atlantic Ocean for Britain. Nature's power over humanity is dramatically demonstrated when the Independence Hurricane (August 29 – September 13) devastates the east coast of North America, killing 4,173, and a smallpox epidemic begins in New England. Smallpox vaccine was then developed by Edward Jenner.

=== January–June ===
- January – The Habsburg monarchy forces the Ottoman Empire to cede Bukovina to its rule.
- January 5 – Wolfgang Amadeus Mozart finishes a Sonata for Keyboard in C.
- January 14 – Siamese conquest of Chiang Mai and the Lan Na Kingdom.
- January 17 – Second voyage of James Cook: Captain James Cook takes possession of South Georgia for the Kingdom of Great Britain.
- February 9 – American Revolution: The Parliament of Great Britain declares the Province of Massachusetts Bay to be in rebellion.
- February 15 – Pope Pius VI succeeds Pope Clement XIV as the 250th pope.
- February 26 – The British East India Company factory on Balambangan Island is destroyed by Moro pirates.
- March 6 – Raghunathrao, Peshwa of the Maratha Empire in India, signs the Treaty of Surat with the British Governor-General Warren Hastings in Bombay ceding the territories of Salsette and Bassein to the British East India Company along with part of the revenues from Surat and Bharuch districts in return for military assistance. This leads to the First Anglo-Maratha War fought between the British and the Marathas, ending with the Treaty of Salbai in 1782.
- March 17 – Catherine the Great of Russia issues a manifesto prohibiting freed serfs from being returned to serfdom.
- March 23 – American Revolution: Patrick Henry, a delegate to the Second Virginia Convention after the Virginia House of Burgesses was disbanded by the Royal Governor, delivers his "Give me Liberty or give me Death!" speech at St. John's Church in Richmond, Virginia.
- April 18 – American Revolution: Paul Revere and William Dawes, instructed by Dr. Joseph Warren, ride from Boston to Lexington to warn John Hancock and Sam Adams that British forces are coming to take them prisoner and to seize colonial weapons and ammunition in Concord.
- April 19 – American Revolution – Battles of Lexington and Concord: Hostility between Britain and its American colonies explodes into bloodshed, igniting the American Revolutionary War.
- May 10 – American Revolution:
  - The Second Continental Congress meets, elects John Hancock president, raises the Continental Army under George Washington as commander and authorizes the colonies to adopt their own constitutions.
  - Ethan Allen and Benedict Arnold, leading the Green Mountain Boys of Vermont, capture Fort Ticonderoga.
- May 17 – American Revolution: The Continental Congress bans trade with Canada.
- June 11
  - Coronation of Louis XVI takes place in Reims. The last coronation of the Ancien Regime before the French Revolution
  - American Revolutionary War – Battle of Machias: In the first naval engagement of the American Revolution, Patriot forces capture the schooner HMS Margaretta.
- June 12 – American Revolution:
  - The British forces offer a pardon to all colonists who lay down their arms.
  - Action by citizens of Machias, Maine, in capturing British ships recognises the existence of a United States Merchant Marine.
- June 14 – American Revolution: The Continental Congress names George Washington as commander of the Continental Army.
- June 16 – The post of chief engineer of the Continental Army is created.
- June 17 – American Revolution: Two months into the colonial siege of Boston, British open fire on Breed's Hill on Charles Town Peninsula. After 3 charges, the British take the hill in the Battle of Bunker Hill.
- June 19 – The post of Commanding General is created by the Continental Congress.

=== July–December ===
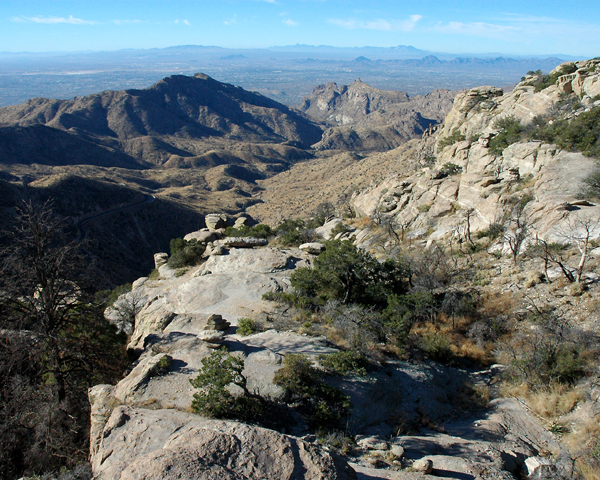
August 18: Tucson is founded.

- July 3 – American Revolution: George Washington takes command of the 17,000-man Continental Army at Cambridge.
- July 5 – American Revolution: The Continental Congress sends the Olive Branch Petition, hoping for a reconciliation.
- July 6 – American Revolution: The Continental Congress issues Declaration of the Causes and Necessity of Taking Up Arms, which contains the words: "Our cause is just. Our union is perfect... being with one mind resolved to die freemen rather than to live slaves...".
- July 26 – The Second Continental Congress appoints Benjamin Franklin to be the first Postmaster General of what later becomes the United States Post Office Department.
- July 30 – Second voyage of James Cook: HMS Resolution (1771) anchors off the south coast of England, Captain Cook having completed the first eastbound global circumnavigation.
- August 18 – Tucson is founded.
- August 21 – American Revolution – Siege of Fort St. Jean: American rebels launch an invasion of Canada.
- August 23 – American Revolution: Refusing to even look at the Olive Branch Petition, King George issues a Proclamation of Rebellion against the American colonies.
- August 29 – September 12 – The Independence Hurricane from South Carolina to Nova Scotia kills 4,170, mostly fishermen and sailors.
- September 25 – American Revolution: Siege of Fort St. Jean – Battle of Longue-Pointe: Thirteen Colonies revolutionary forces under Maj. Ethan Allen attack Montreal in Quebec, commanded by British General Guy Carleton. Allen's forces are defeated, and Allen himself is captured and held on British ships until he is released.
- October – The Sayre Plotters attempt to kidnap George III of the United Kingdom.
- October 13 – American Revolution: The Continental Congress orders the establishment of the Continental Navy (later the United States Navy).
- October 26 – American Revolution: George III announces to Parliament that the American colonies are in an uprising and must be dealt with accordingly.
- November – American Revolution: Colonel Richard Richardson's South Carolina revolutionaries march through Ninety-Six District in what becomes known as the Snow Campaign, effectively ending all major support for the Loyalist cause in the backcountry of South Carolina.
- November 7 – American Revolution: John Murray, 4th Earl of Dunmore, British royal governor of the Colony of Virginia, signs Dunmore's Proclamation, declaring martial law and offering freedom to slaves of Patriots who run away from their owners and join the Loyalist forces (formal proclamation November 15) thus losing the support of planters who see slaves as their vital livelihood.
- November 10 – American Revolution: The Continental Congress passes a resolution creating the Continental Marines to serve as landing troops for the recently created Continental Navy (the Marines are disbanded at end of the war in April 1783 but reformed on July 11, 1798 as the United States Marine Corps).
- November 13 – American Revolution: Battle of Montreal – American forces under Brigadier General Richard Montgomery capture Montreal. British General Guy Carleton escapes to Quebec.
- November 17 – The city of Kuopio, Finland (belonging to Sweden at this time) is founded by King Gustav III of Sweden.
- December 5 – American Revolution: Henry Knox begins his journey to Cambridge, Massachusetts with the artillery that has been captured from Fort Ticonderoga.
- December 31 – American Revolution: Battle of Quebec – British forces repulse an attack by Continental Army generals Richard Montgomery and Benedict Arnold at Quebec; Montgomery is killed.

=== Date unknown ===
- Industrial Revolution in Great Britain.
  - James Watt's 1769 steam engine patent is extended to June 1800 by Act of Parliament and the first engines are built under it.
  - John Wilkinson invents and patents a new kind of boring machine.
- Catherine the Great decrees a Statute for the Administration of the Provinces of the Russian Empire dividing the country into provinces and districts for efficient government.
- A smallpox epidemic begins in New England.
- Typhoon Liengkieki devastates the Pacific atoll of Pingelap.
- Wolfgang Amadeus Mozart writes his five violin concertos in Salzburg at about this date.
- The Calcutta Theatre is inaugurated.
- Shneur Zalman of Liadi founds the Chabad-Lubavitch Hasidic Jewish dynasty.
- Probable date – Jeanne Baret returns to France, becoming the first woman to complete a circumnavigation of the globe.
- Breguet, one of the oldest Swiss luxury watch brands, clock and jewelry manufacturers is founded by Abraham-Louis Breguet in Paris.

== Births ==
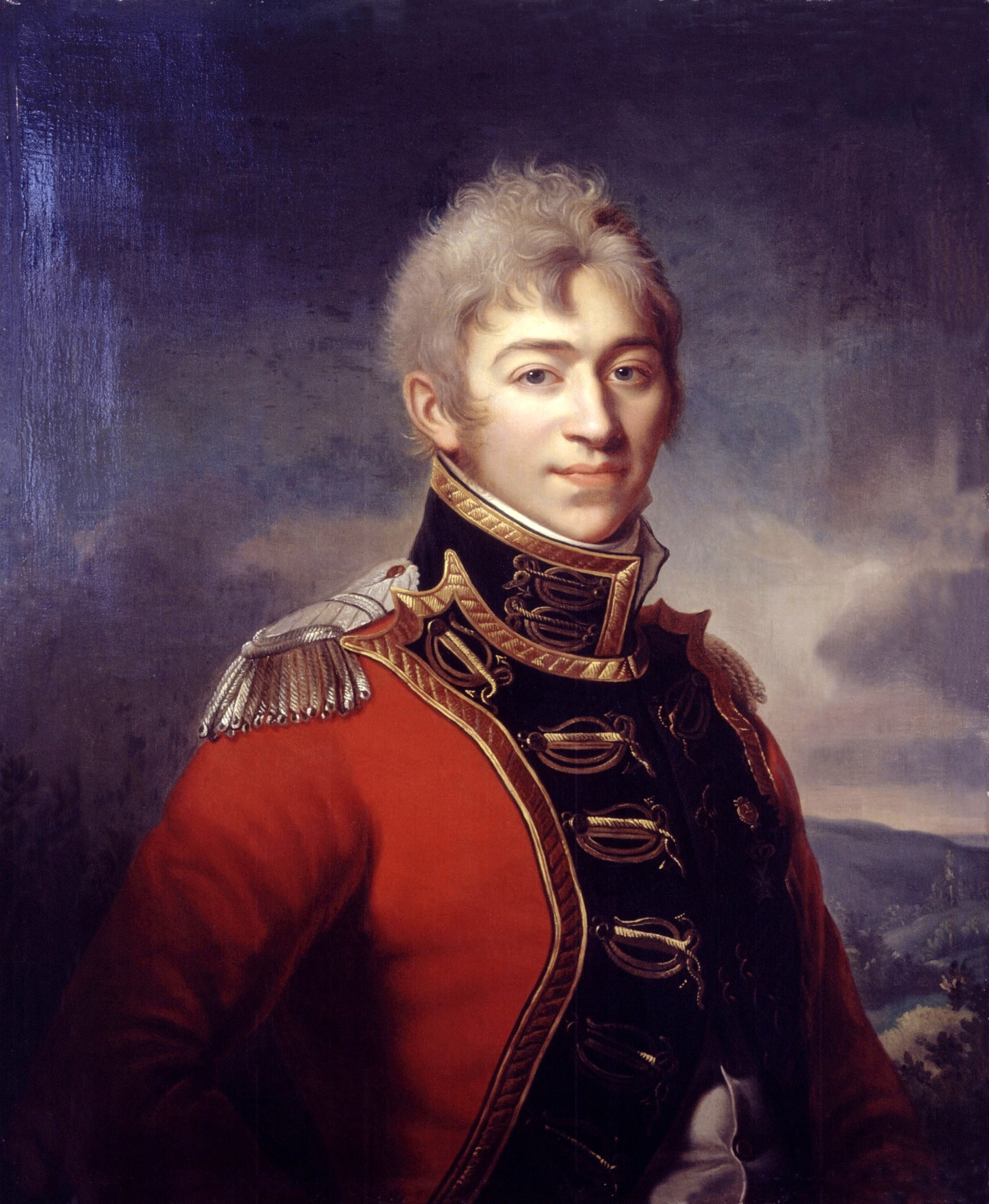
Stanisław Kostka Zamoyski born 13 January

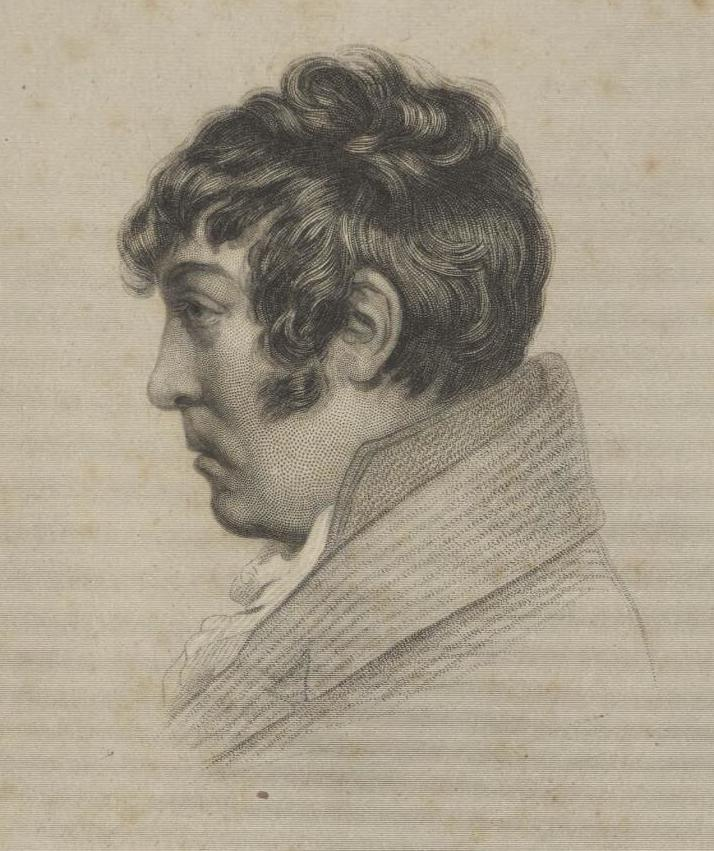
Walter Savage Landor born 30 January

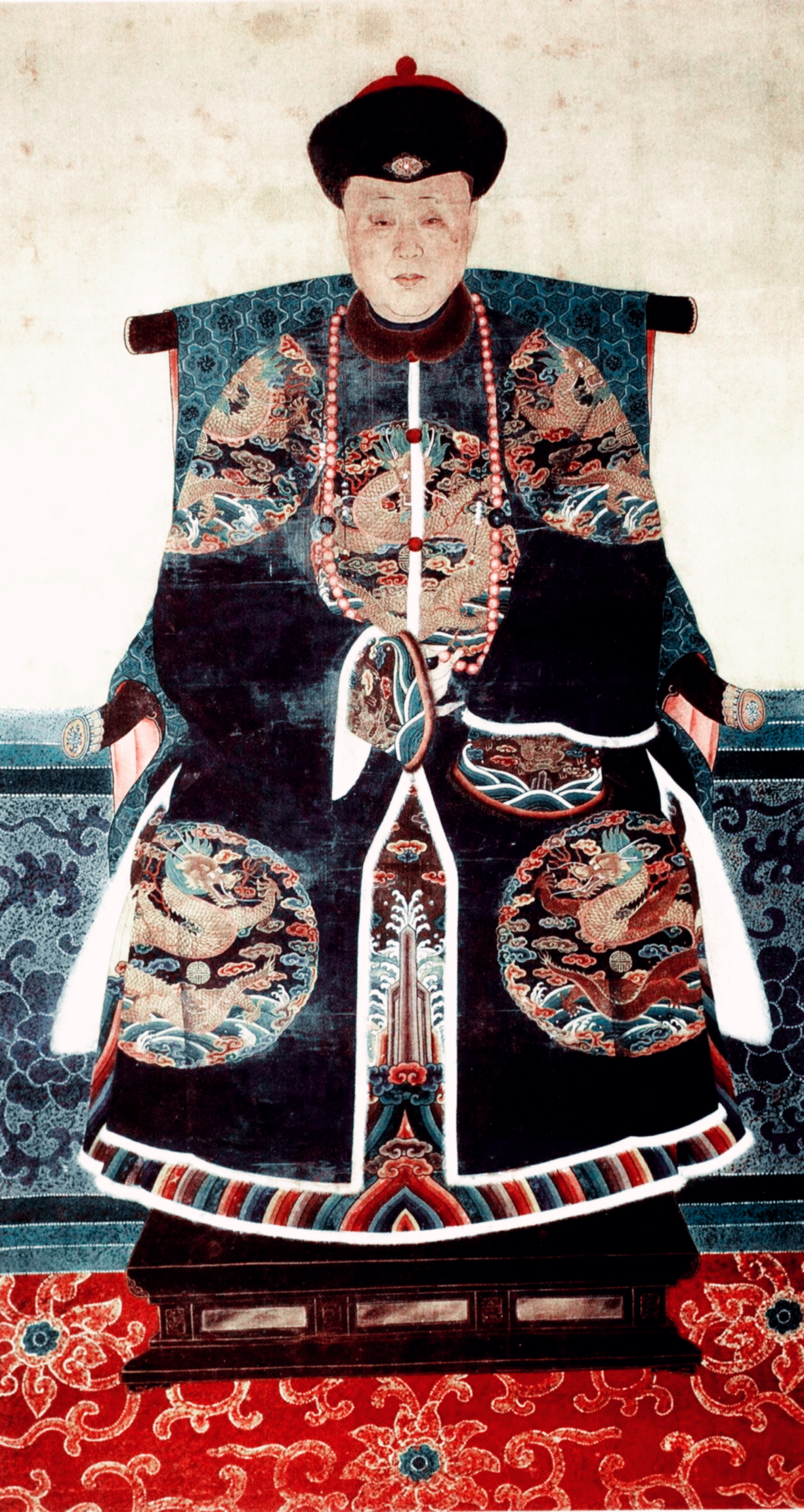
Gurun Princess Hexiao born 2 February

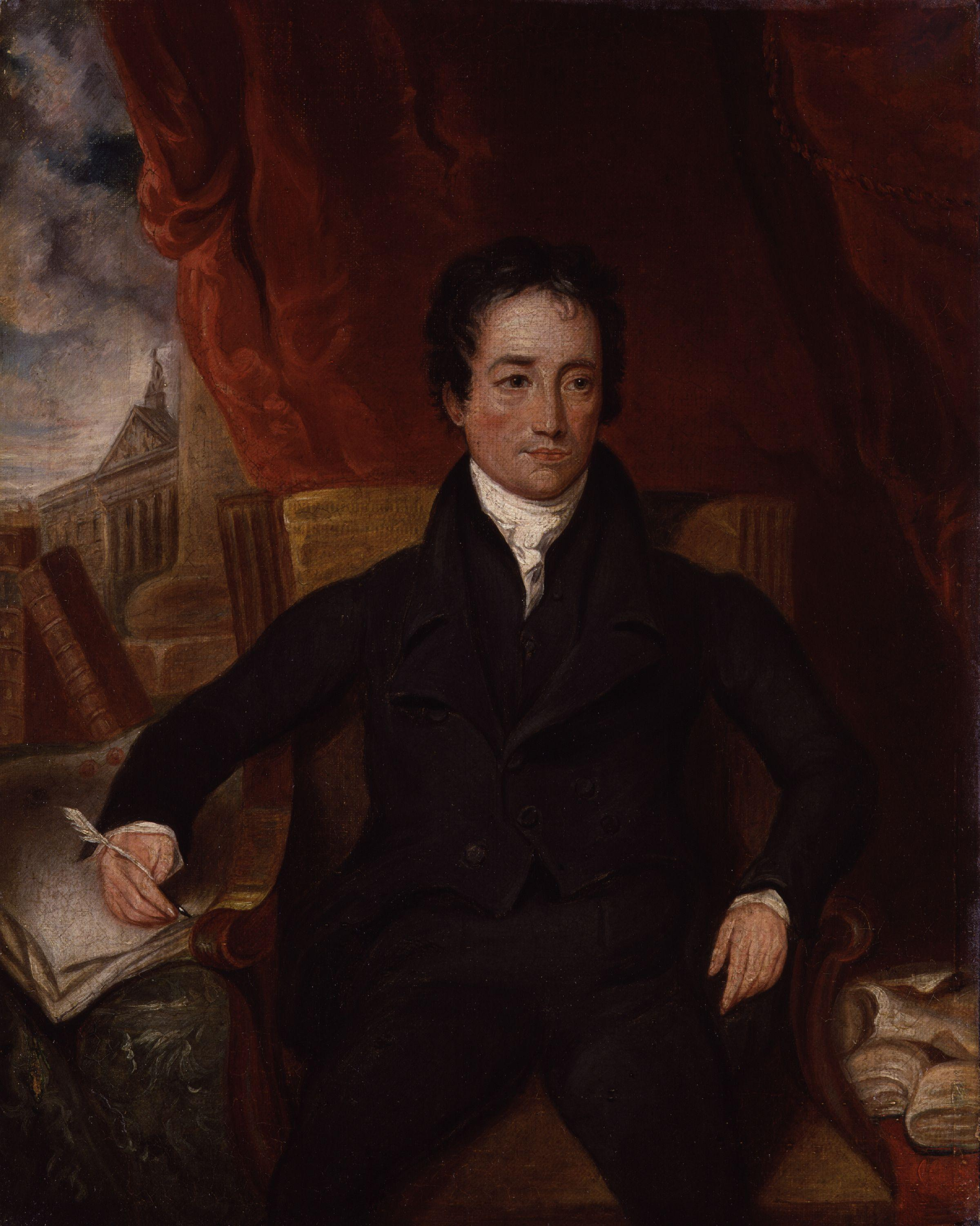
Charles Lamb born 10 February

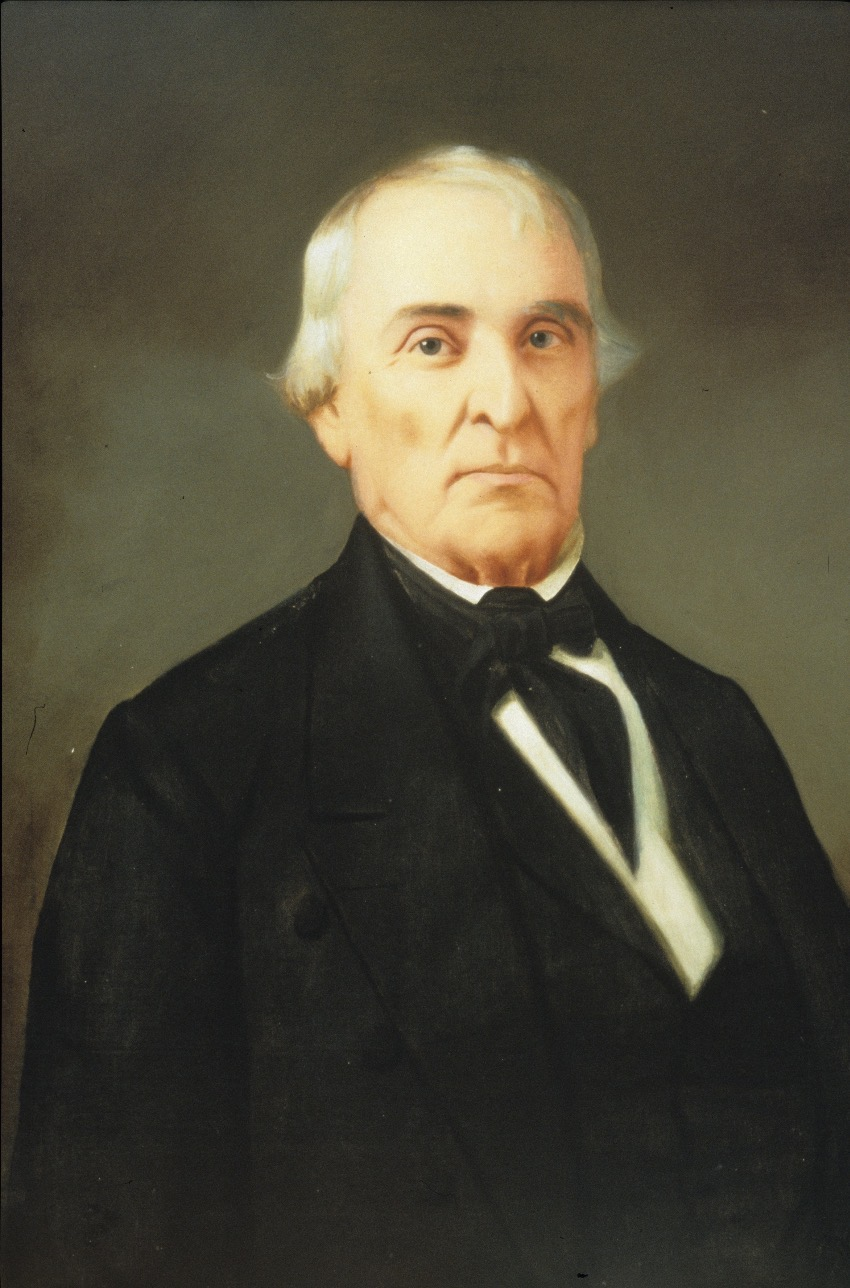
William Hall (governor) born 11 February

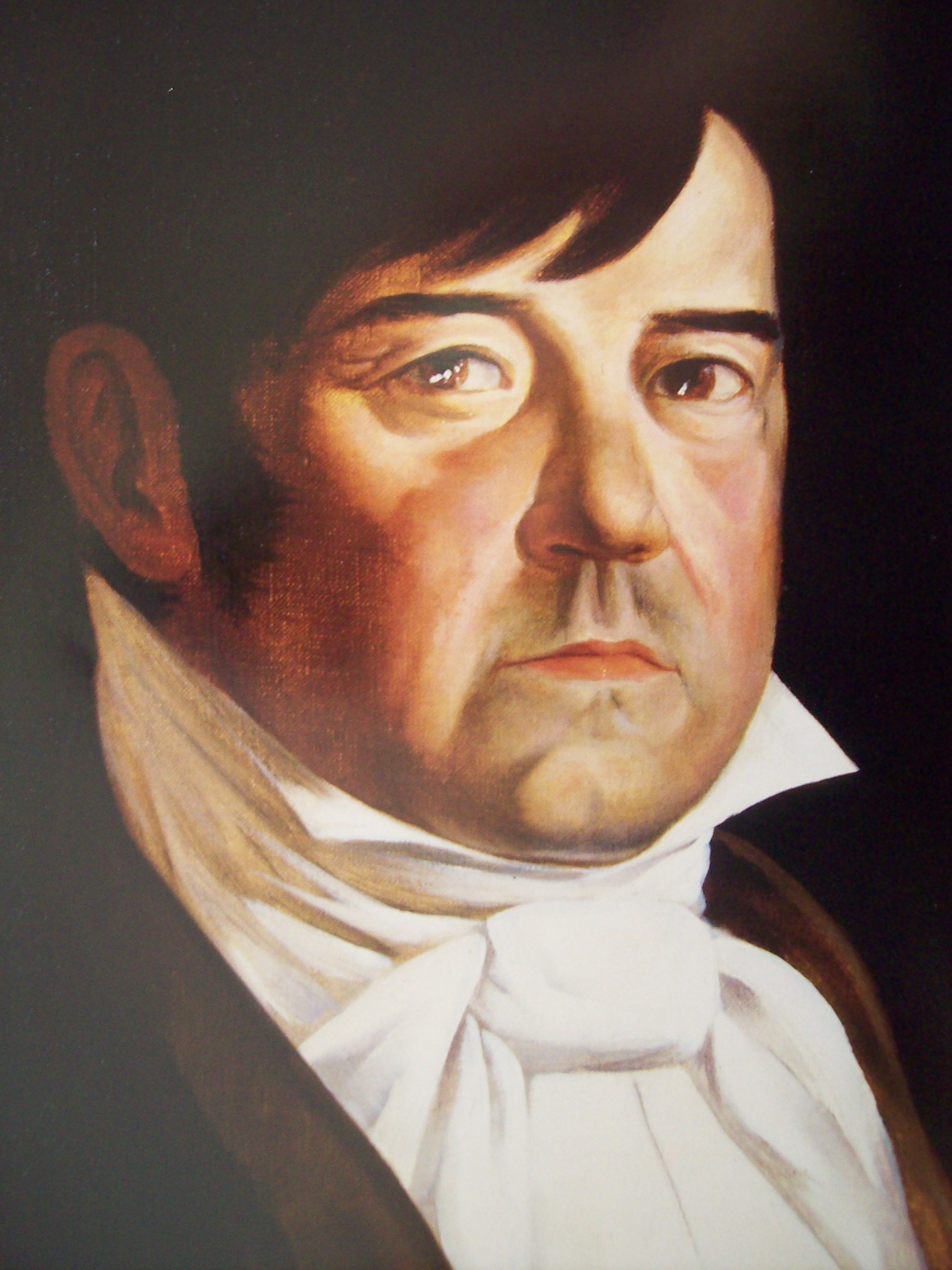
Miguel Ramos Arizpe born 15 February

Simmons Jones Baker born 15 February

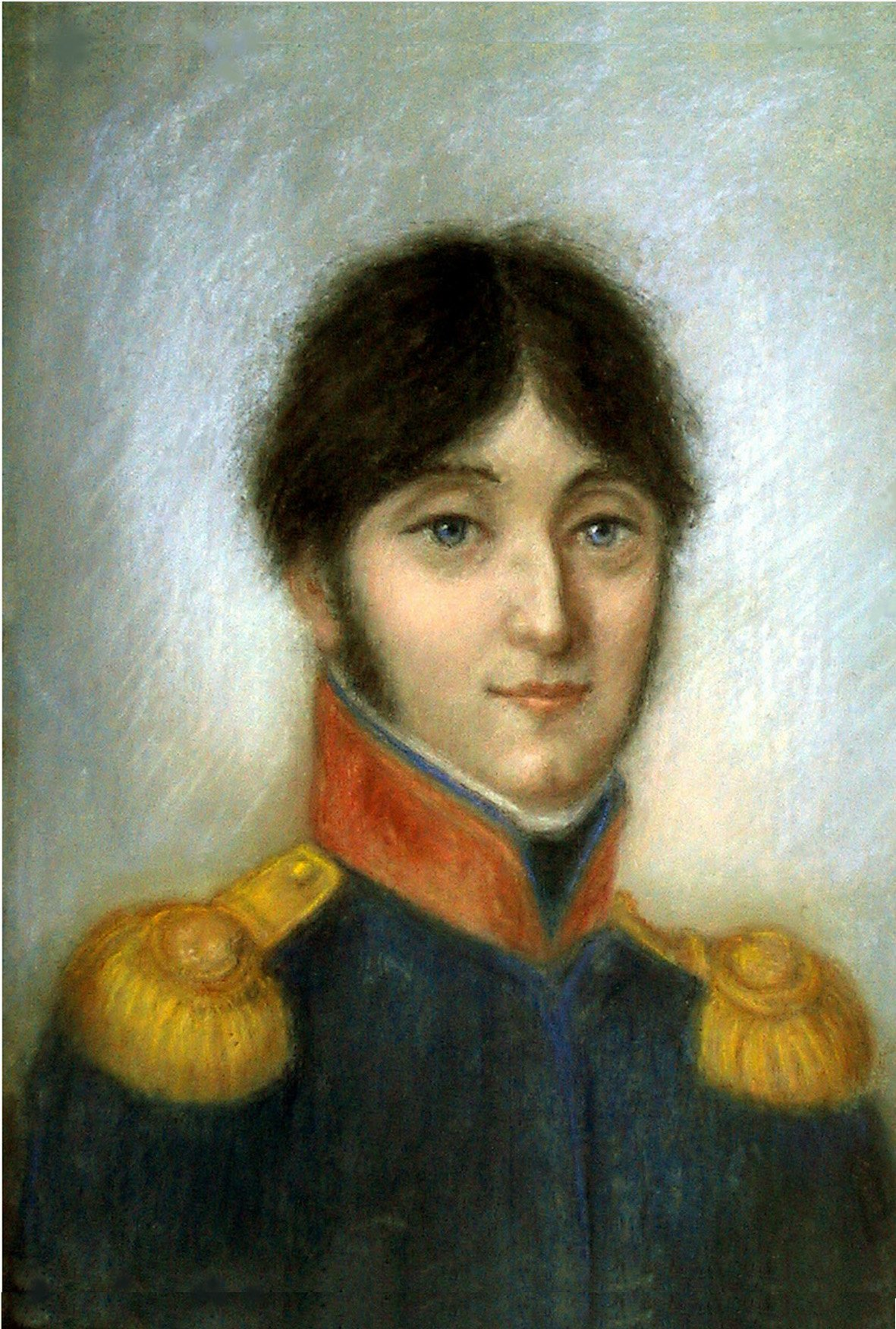
Jean-Baptiste Girard (soldier) born 21 February

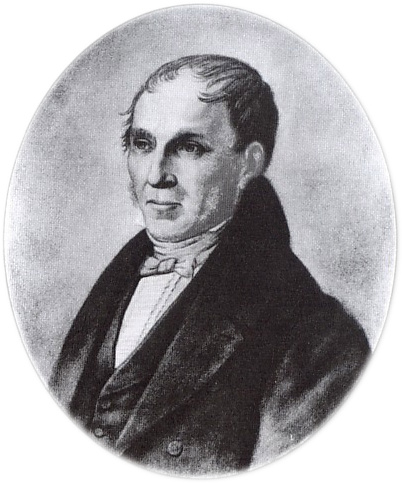
Adolf Stieler born 26 February

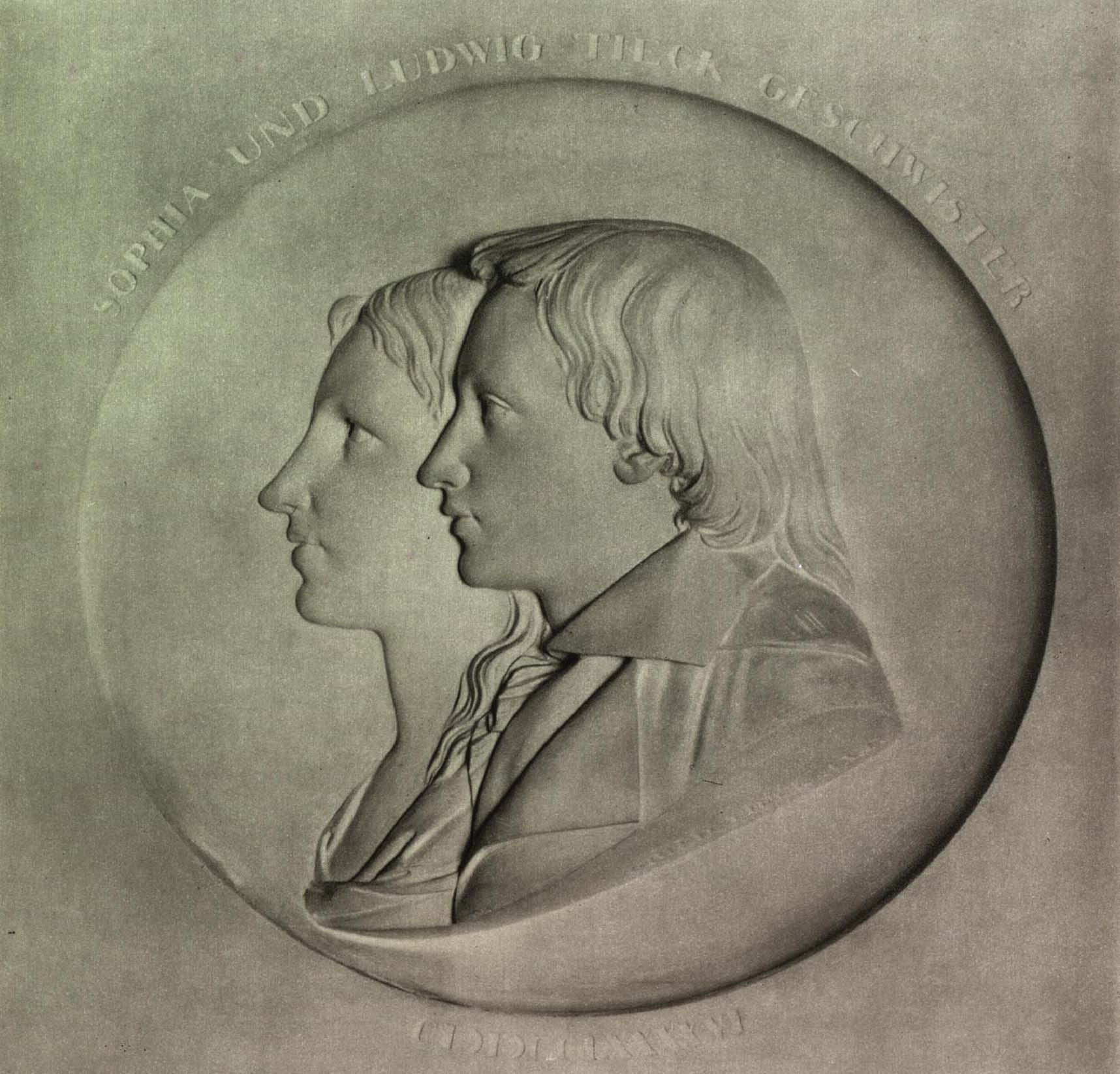
Sophie Tieck born 28 February

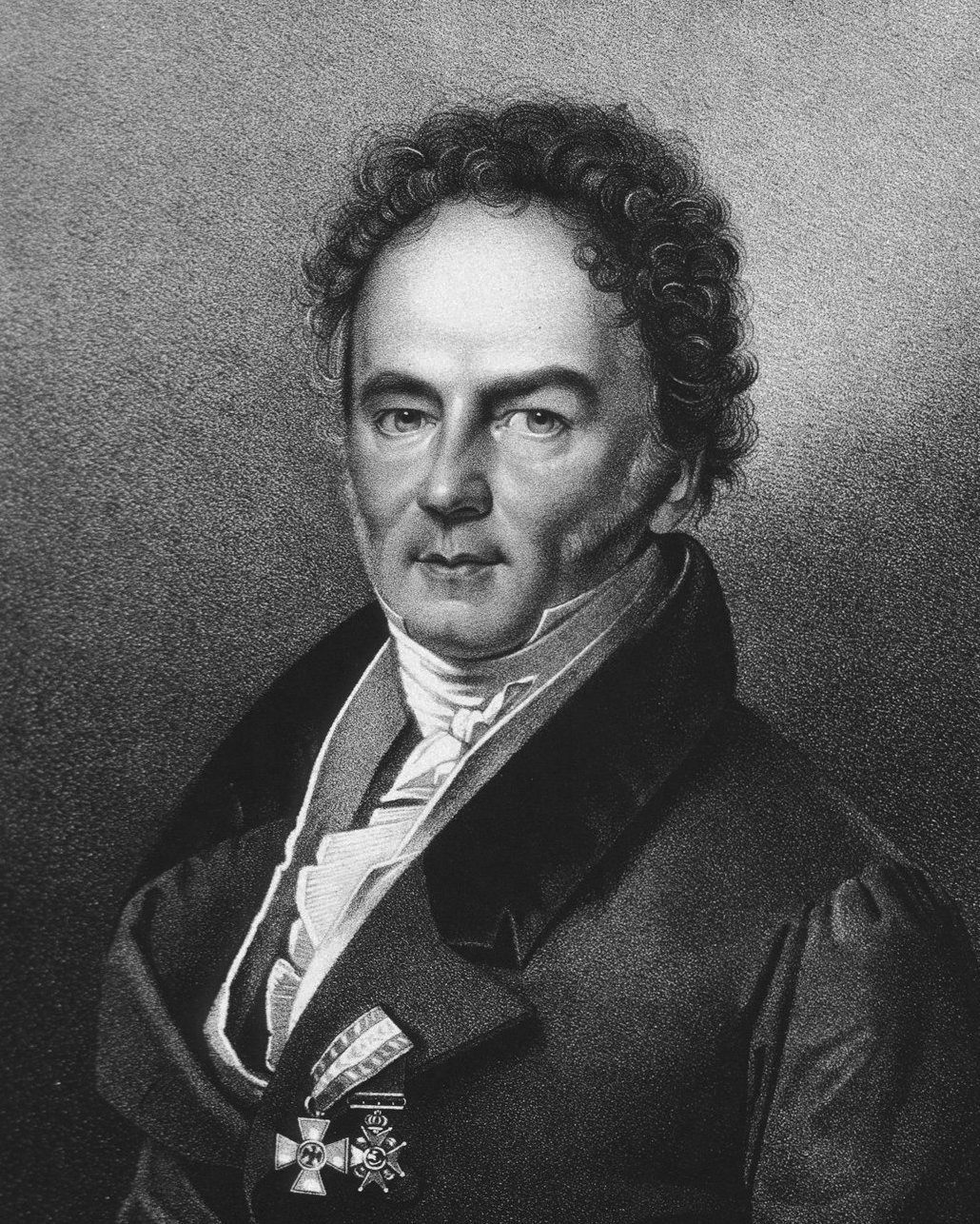
Adam Elias von Siebold born 5 March

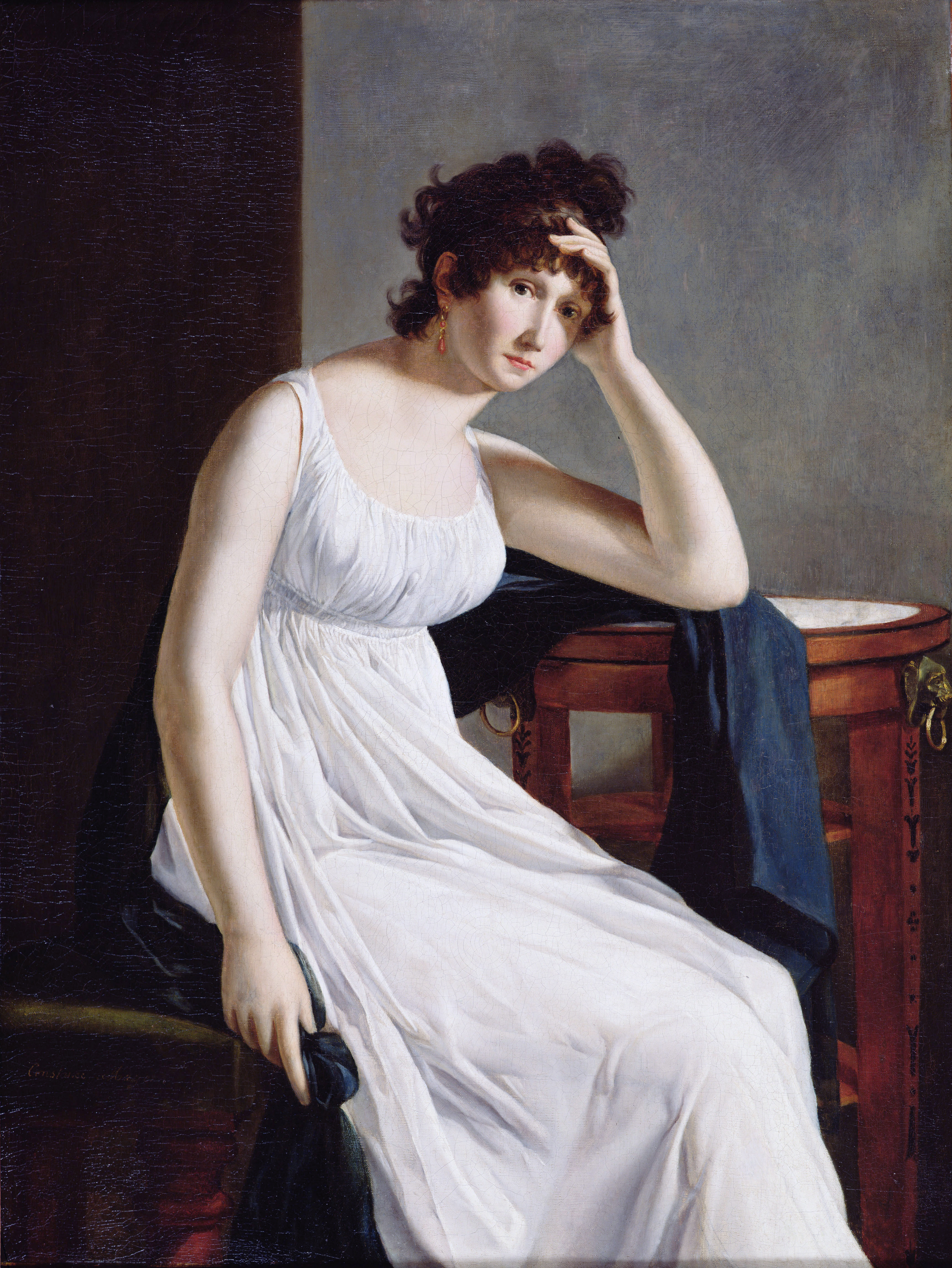
Constance Mayer born 9 March

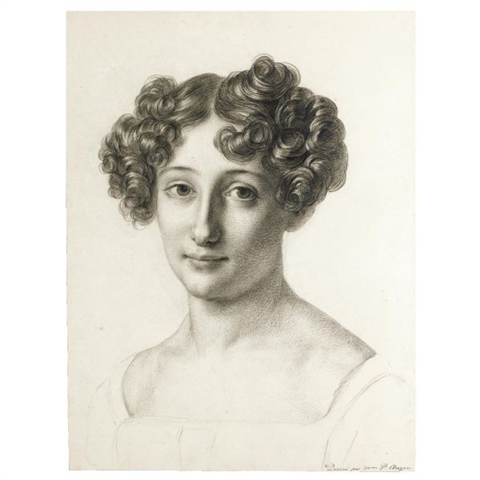
Pauline Auzou born 24 March

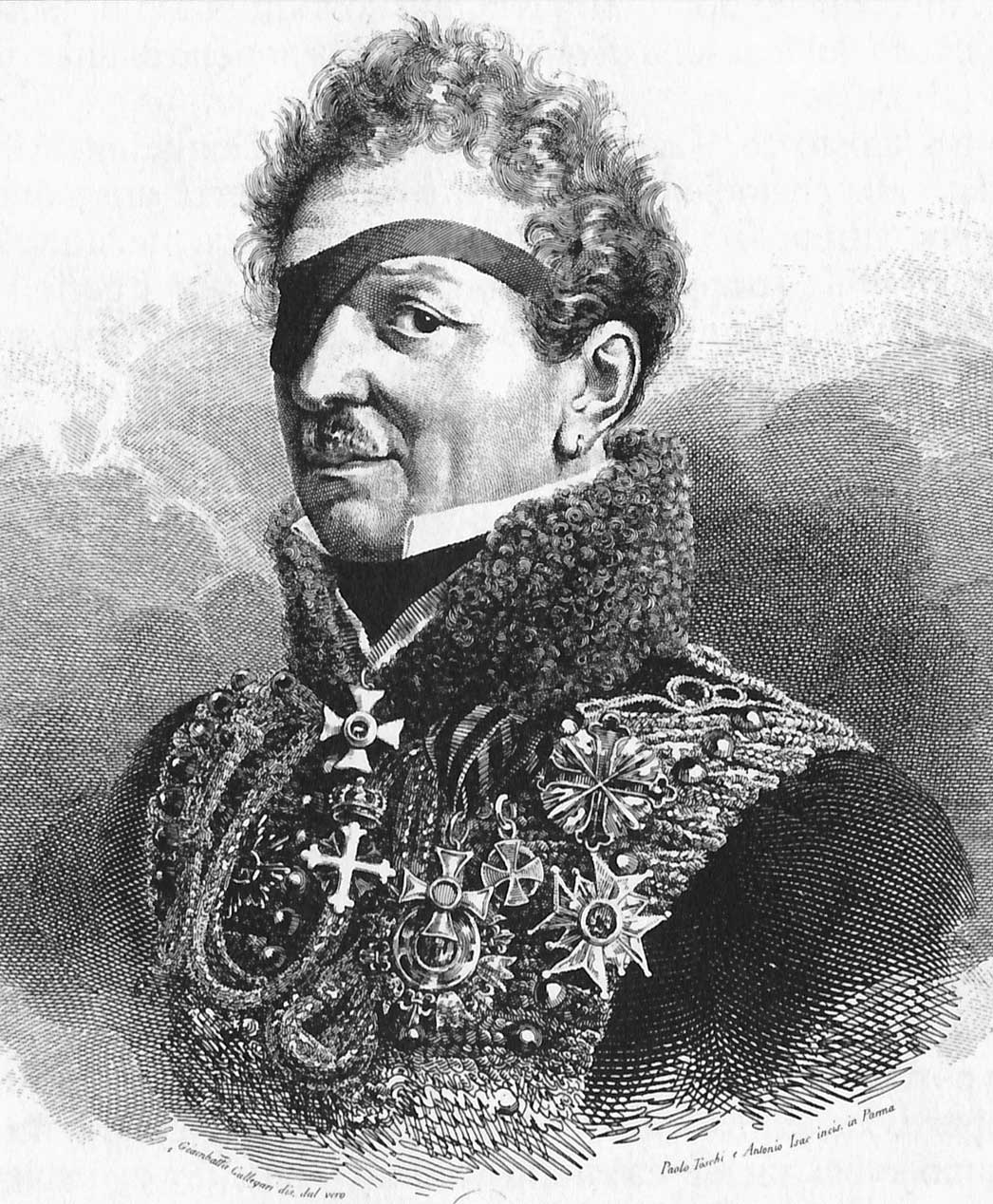
Adam Albert von Neipperg born 8 April

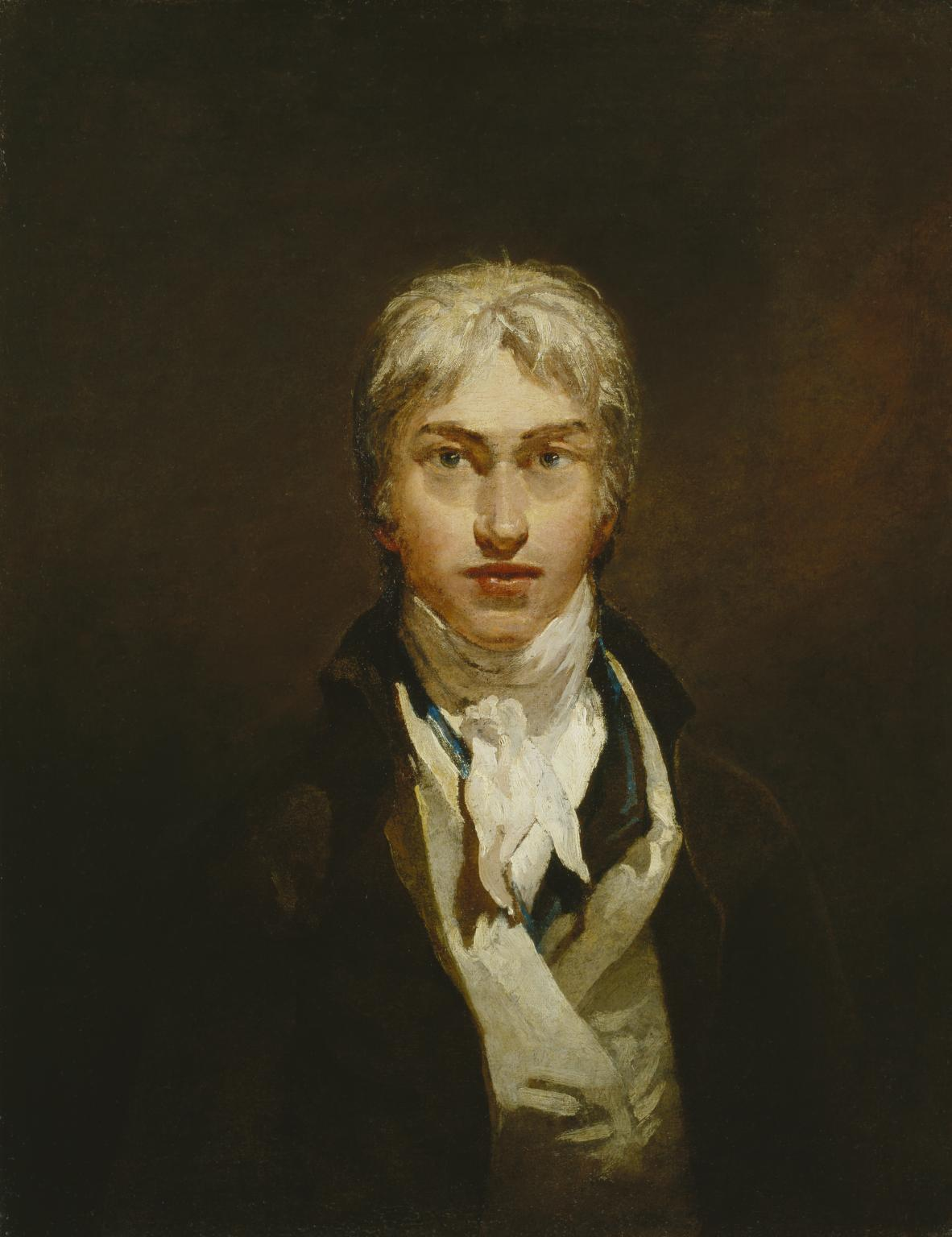
J. M. W. Turner born 23 April

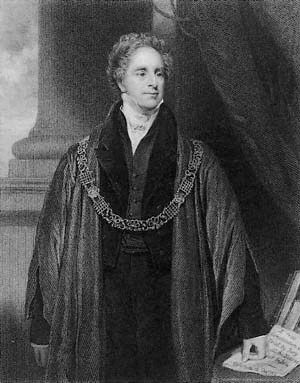
Alexander Johnston (1775–1849) born 25 April

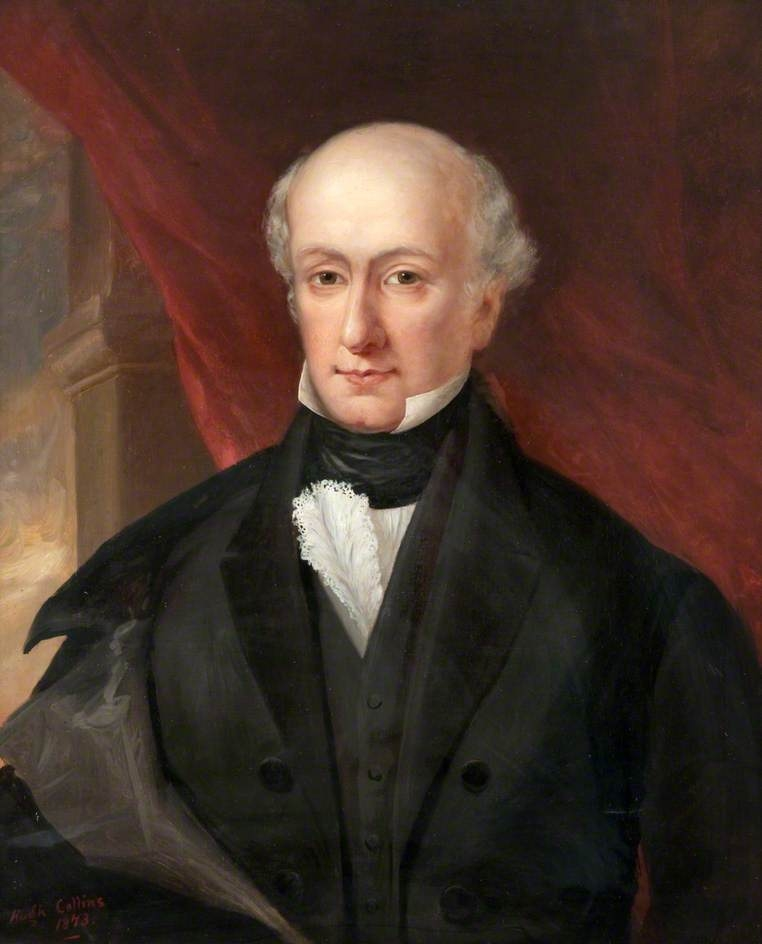
George Kinloch (politician) born 30 April

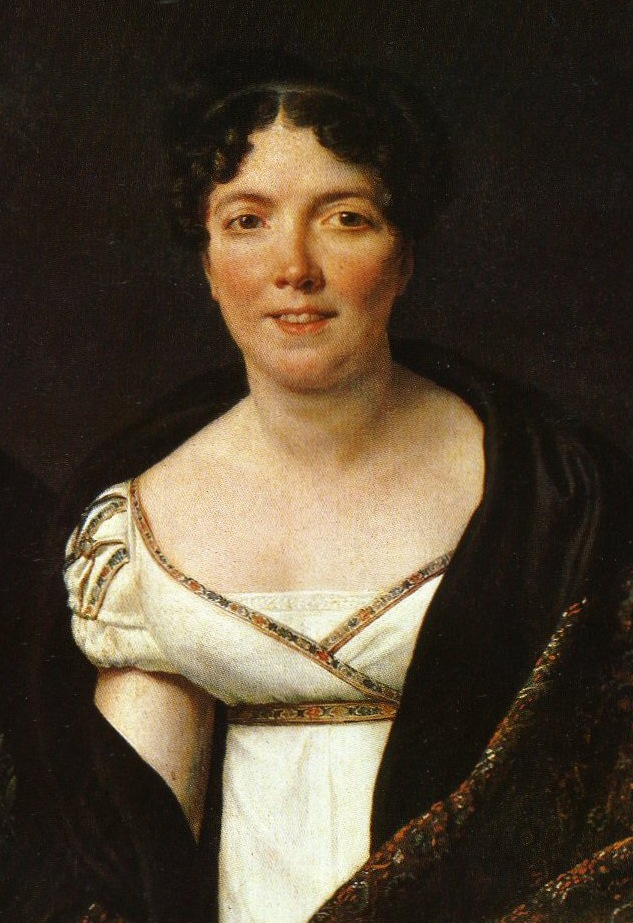
Angélique Mongez born 1 May

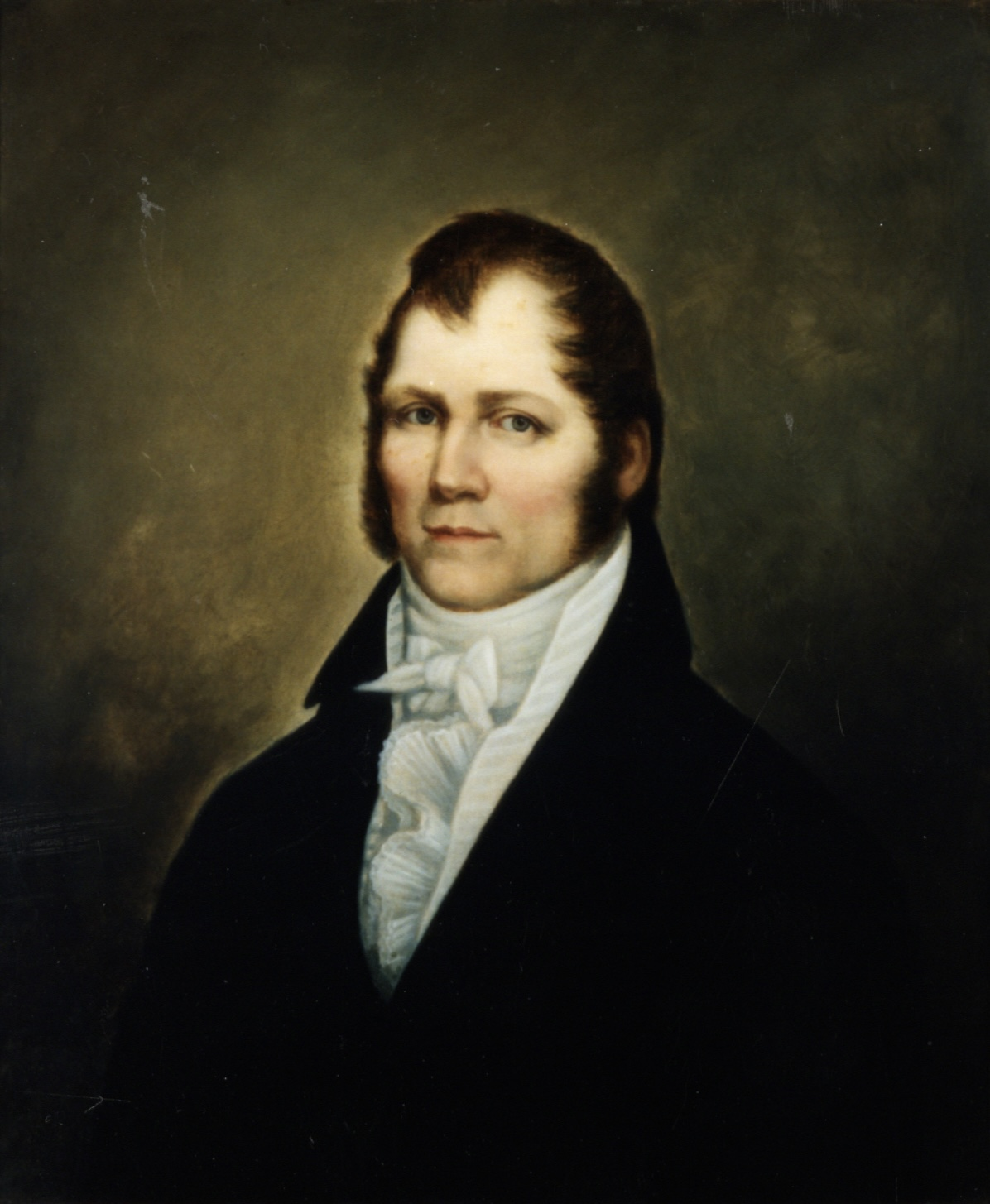
Alexander McNair born 5 May

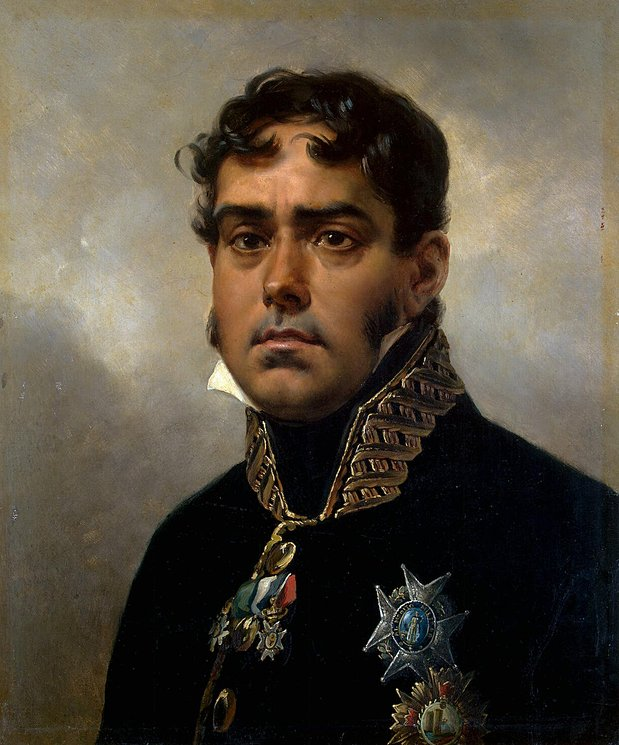
Pablo Morillo born 5 May

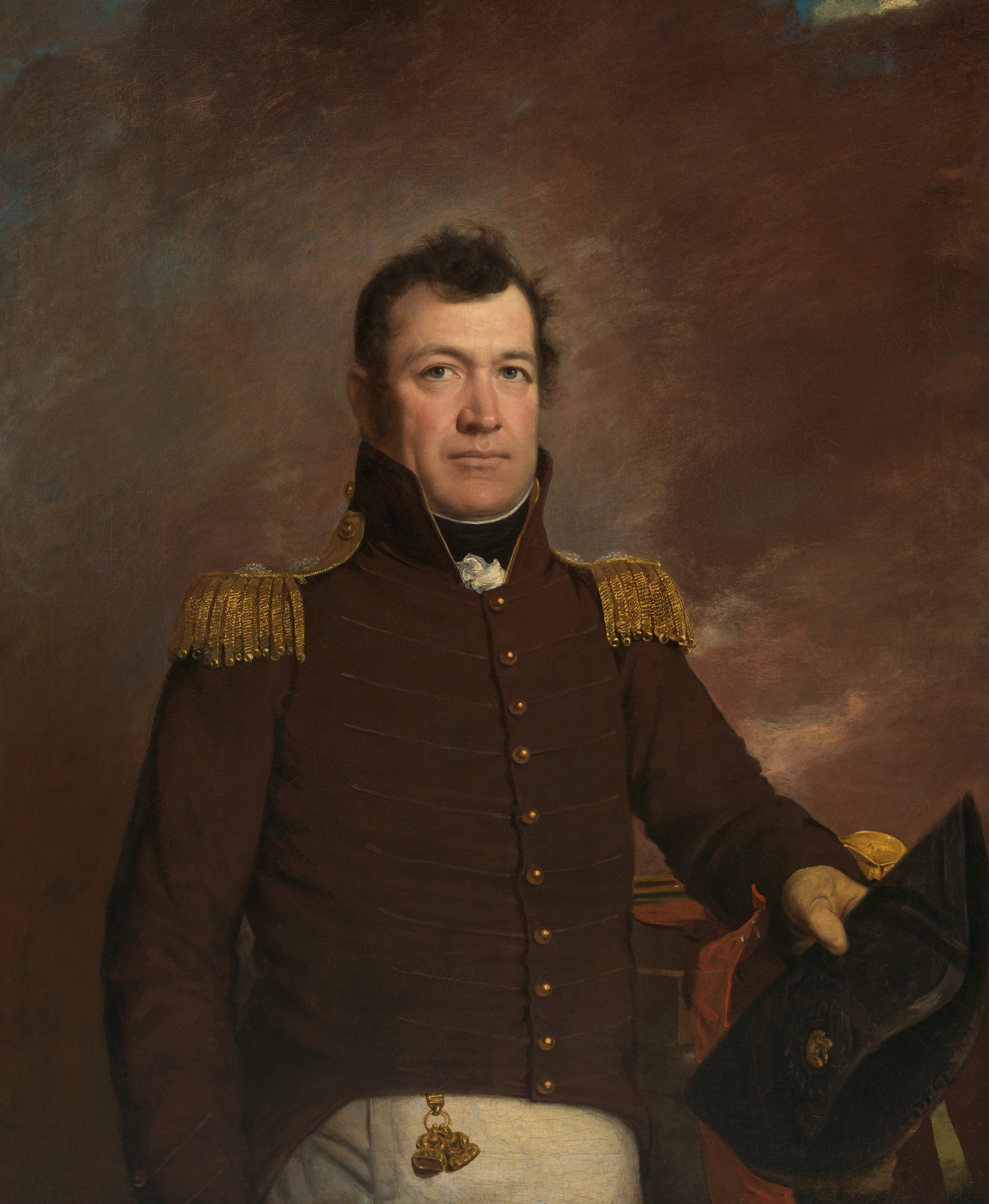
Jacob Brown born 9 May

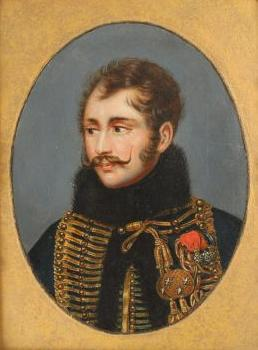
Antoine Charles Louis de Lasalle born 10 May

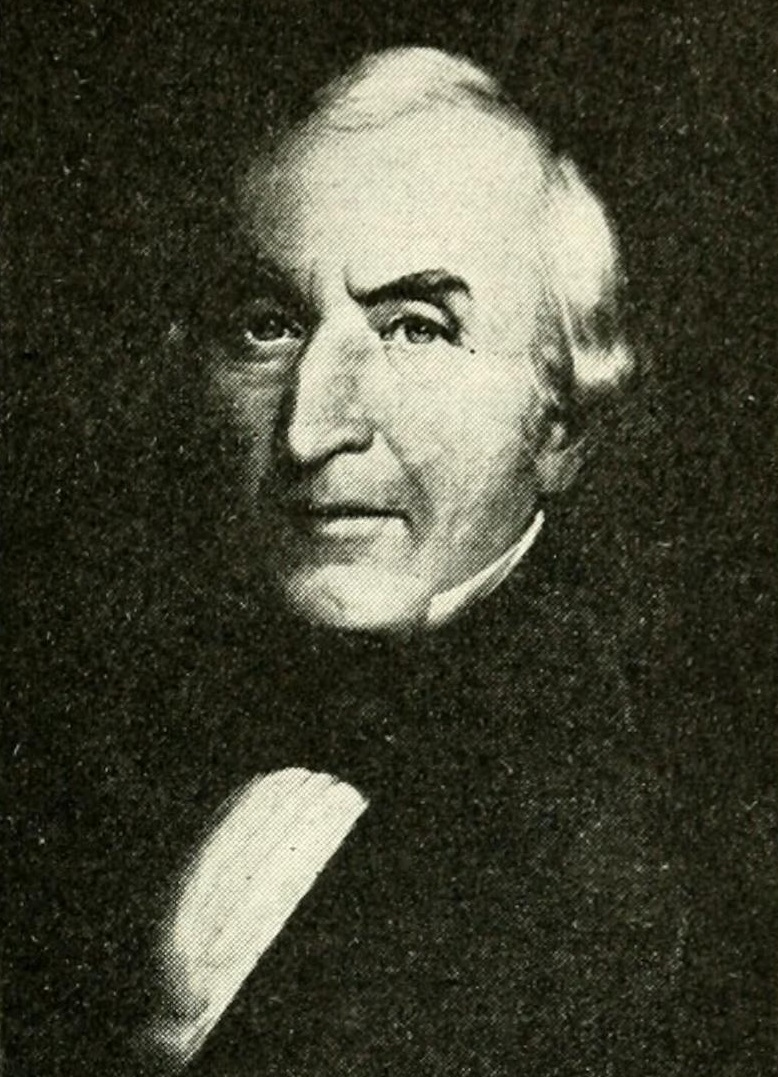
Micah Brooks born 14 May

Johann Baptist Malfatti von Monteregio born 12 June

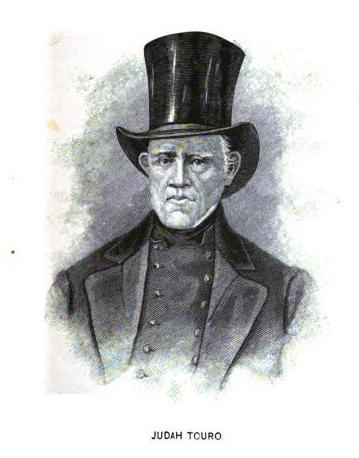
Judah Touro born 16 June

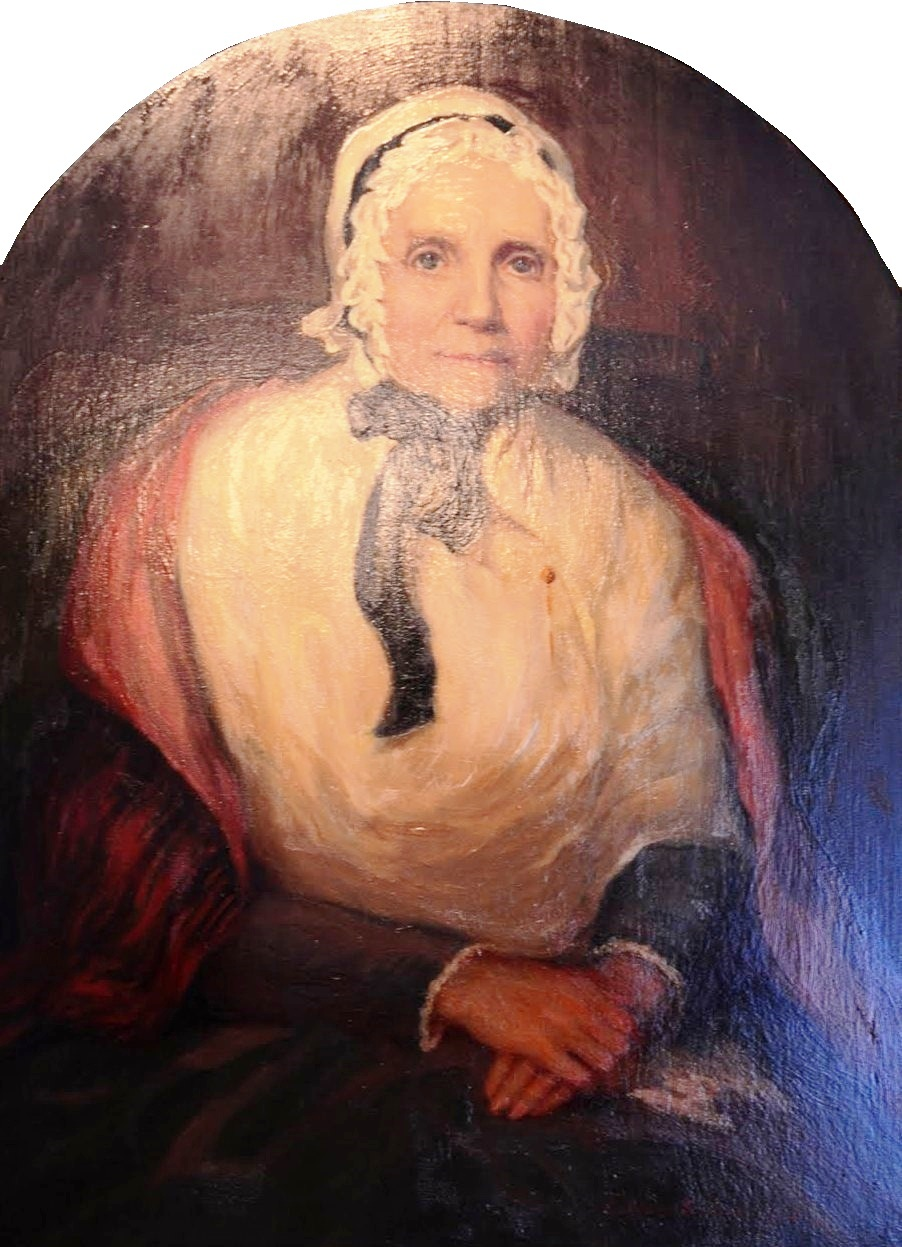
Lucy Mack Smith born 8 July

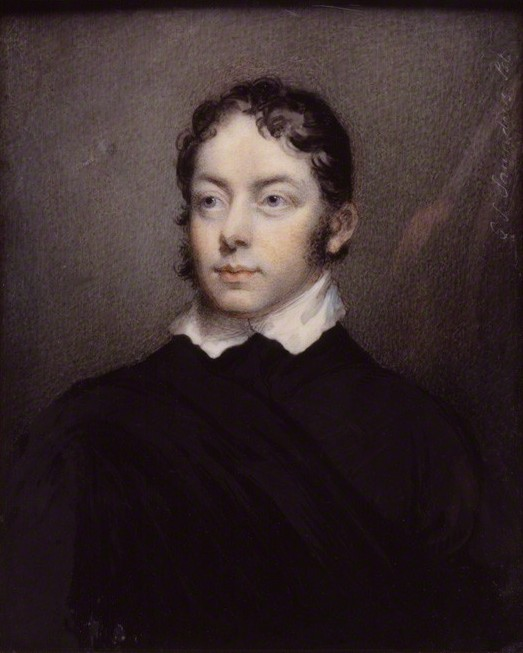
Matthew Lewis (writer) born 9 July

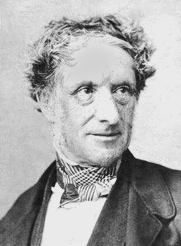
Richard Westmacott born 15 July

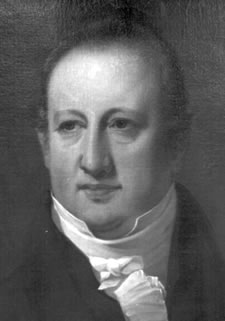
John Andrew Shulze born 19 July

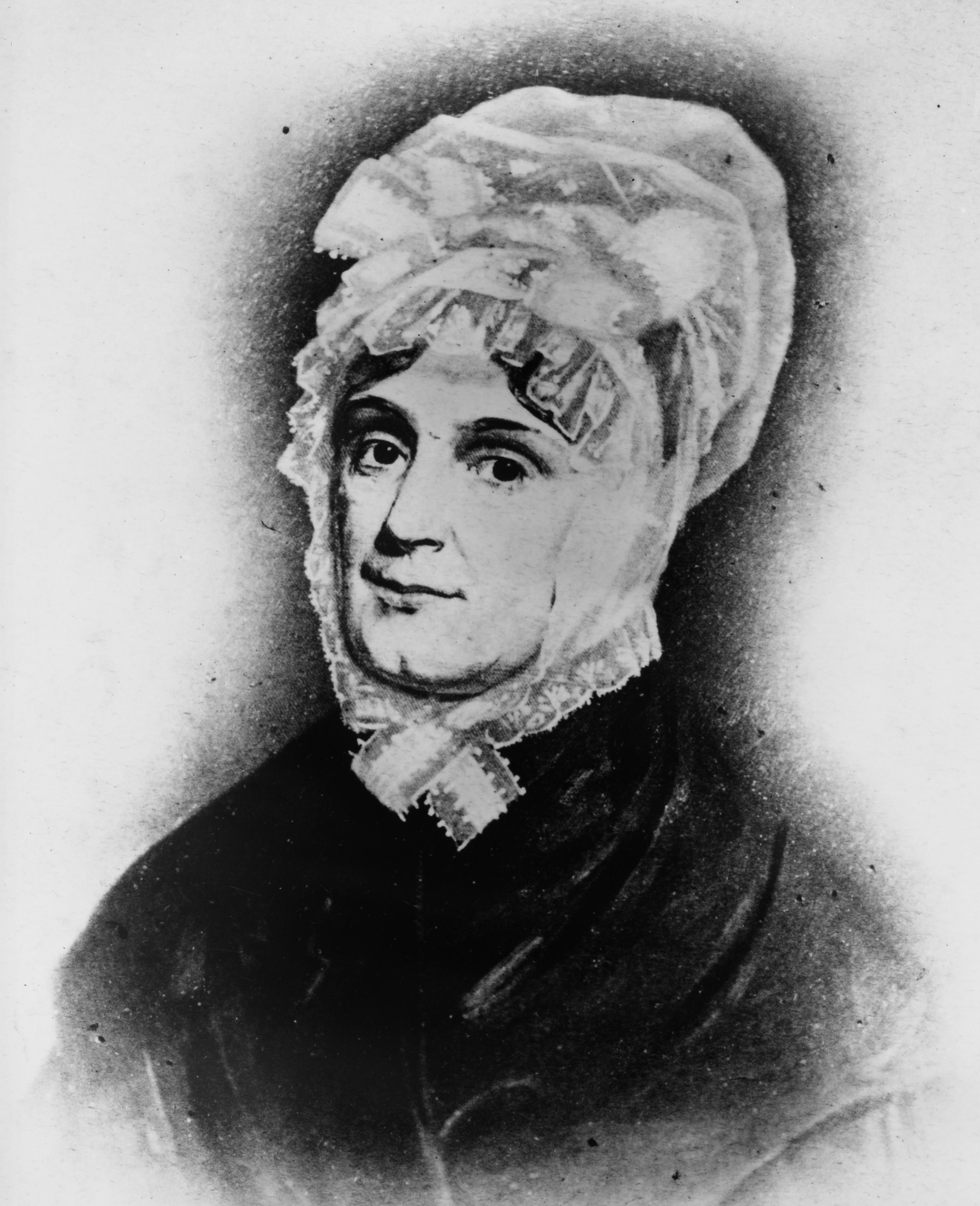
Anna Harrison born 25 July

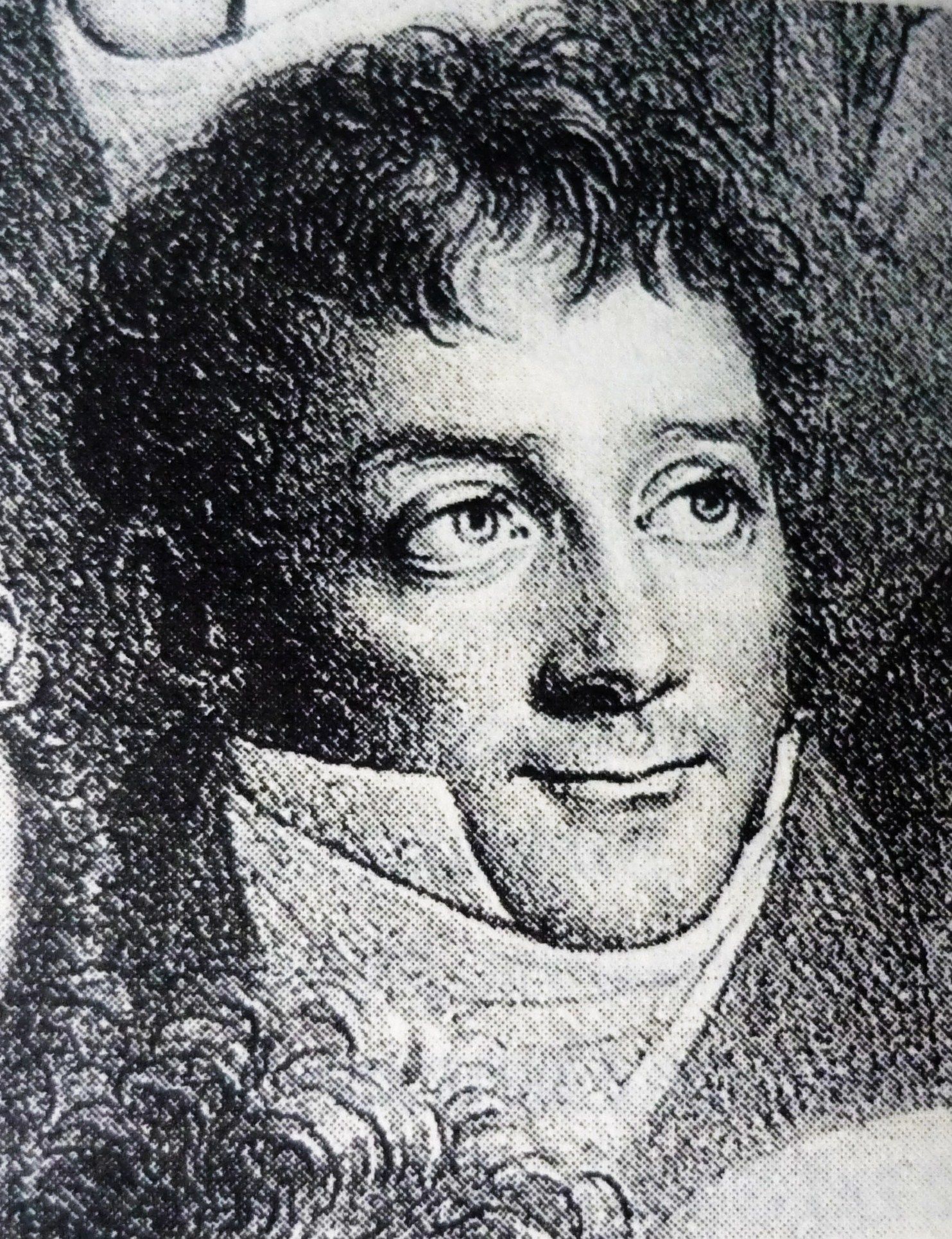
Emmanuel Dupaty born 31 July

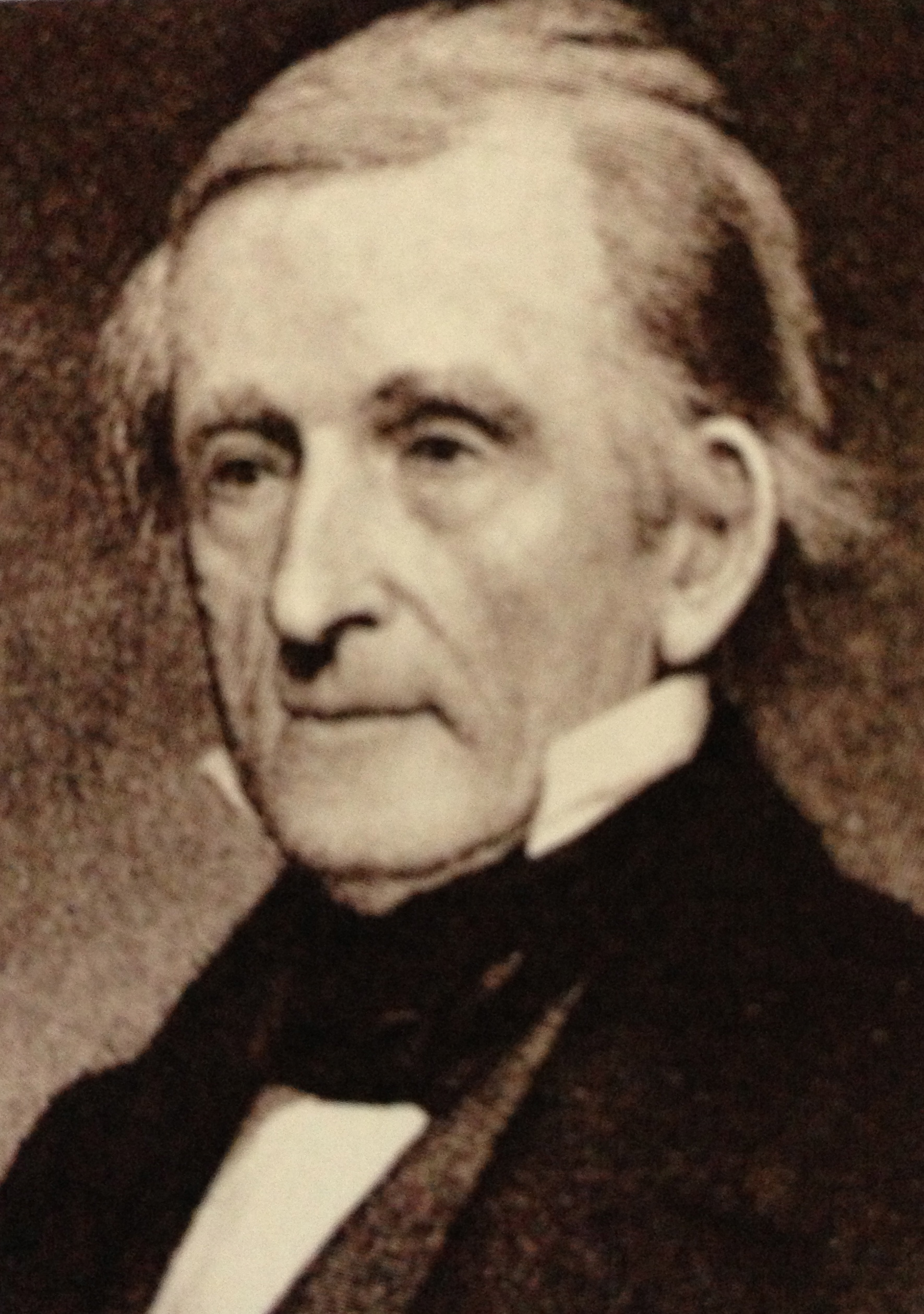
George Tucker (politician) born 20 August

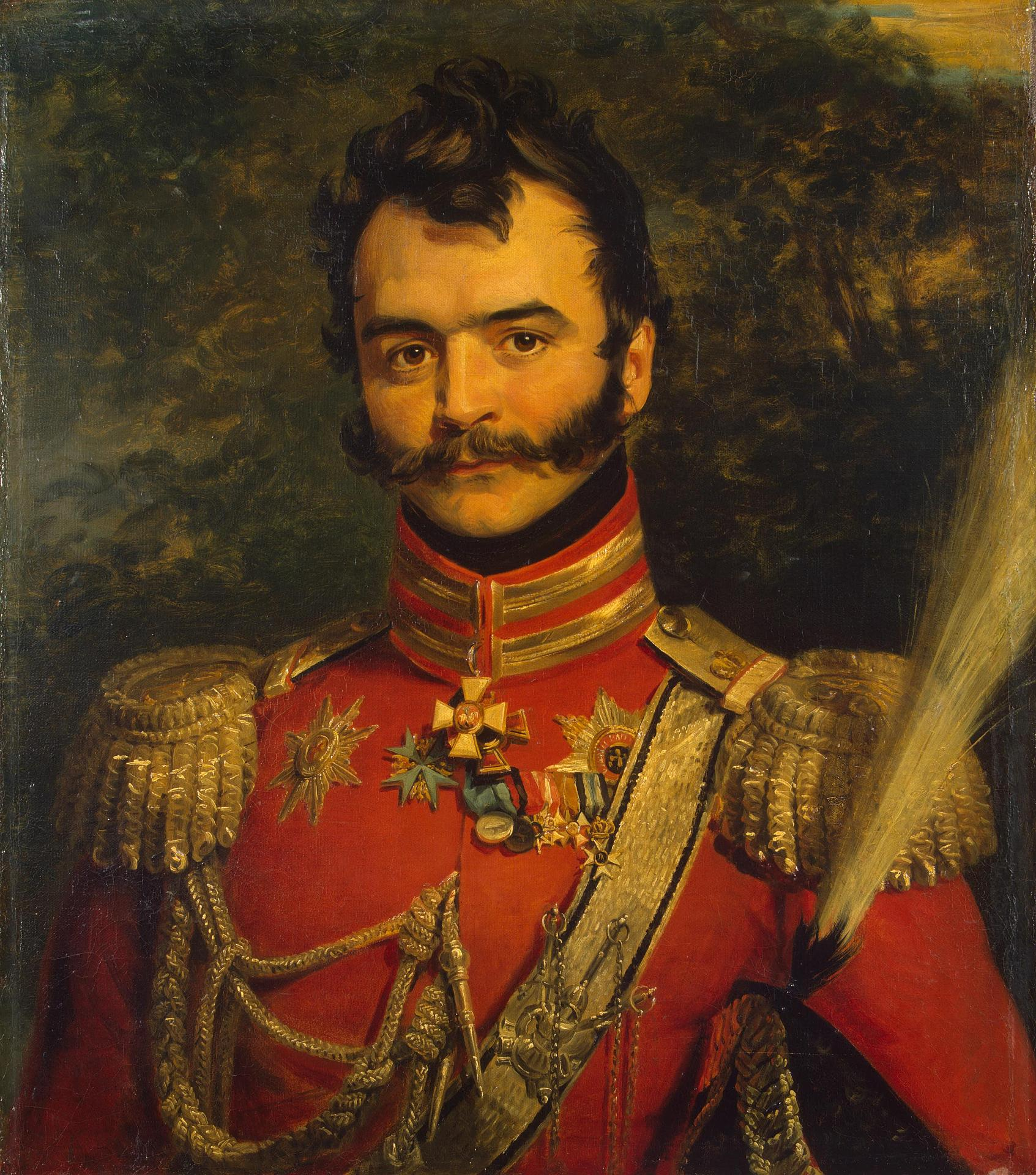
Vasily Orlov-Denisov born 8 September

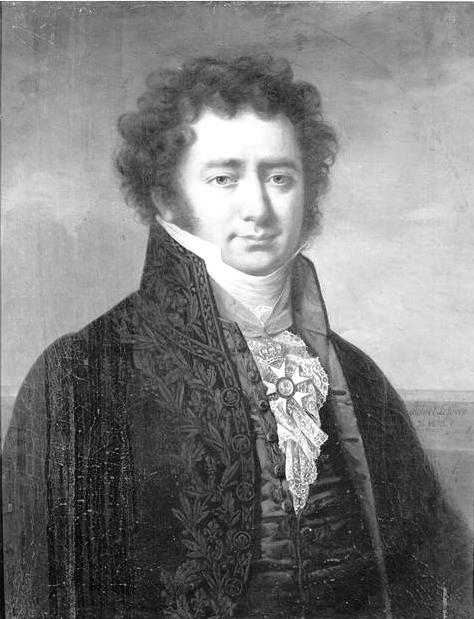
Guillaume Capelle born 9 September

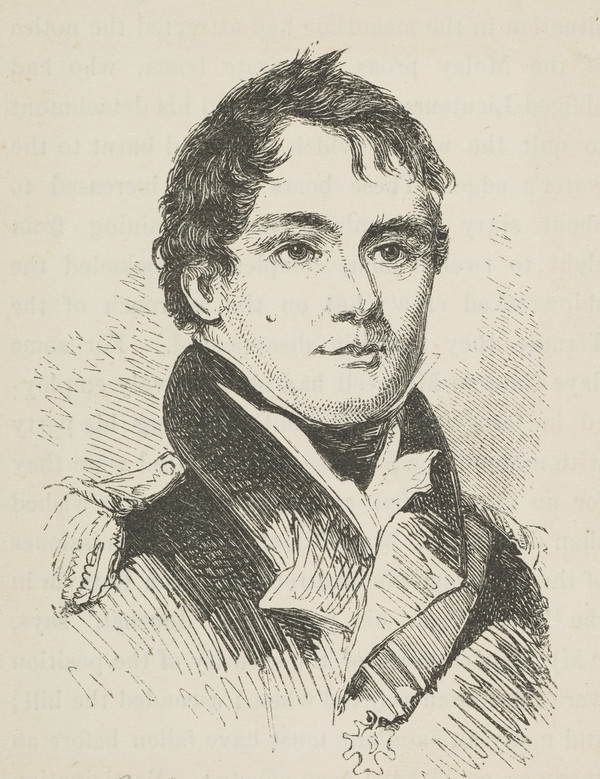
Murray Maxwell born 10 September

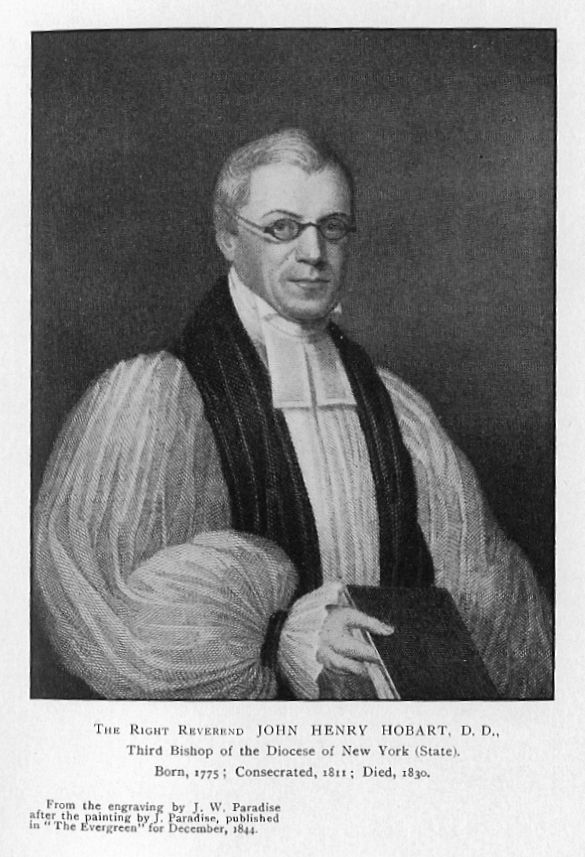
John Henry Hobart born 14 September

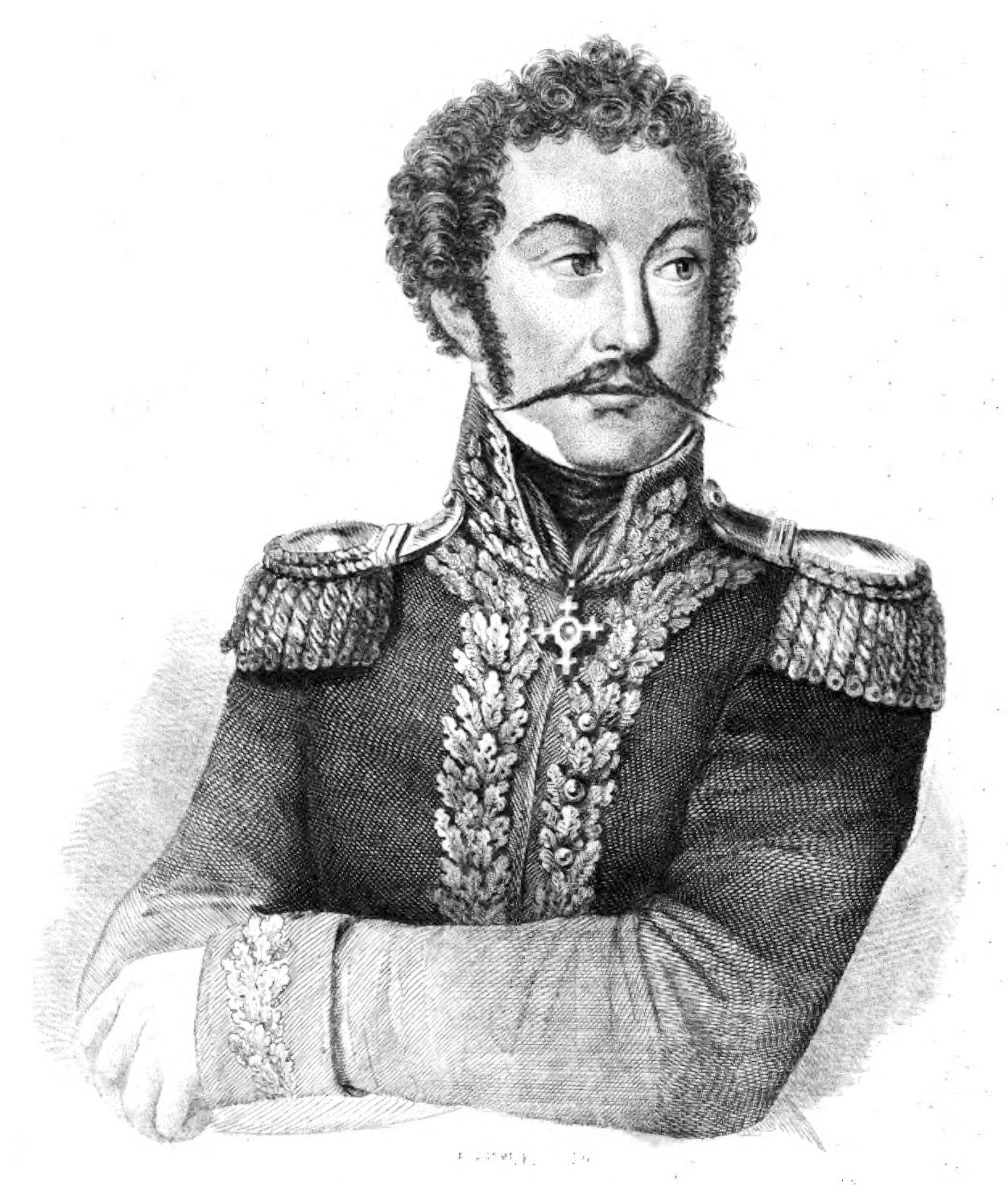
Giuseppe Rosaroll born 16 September

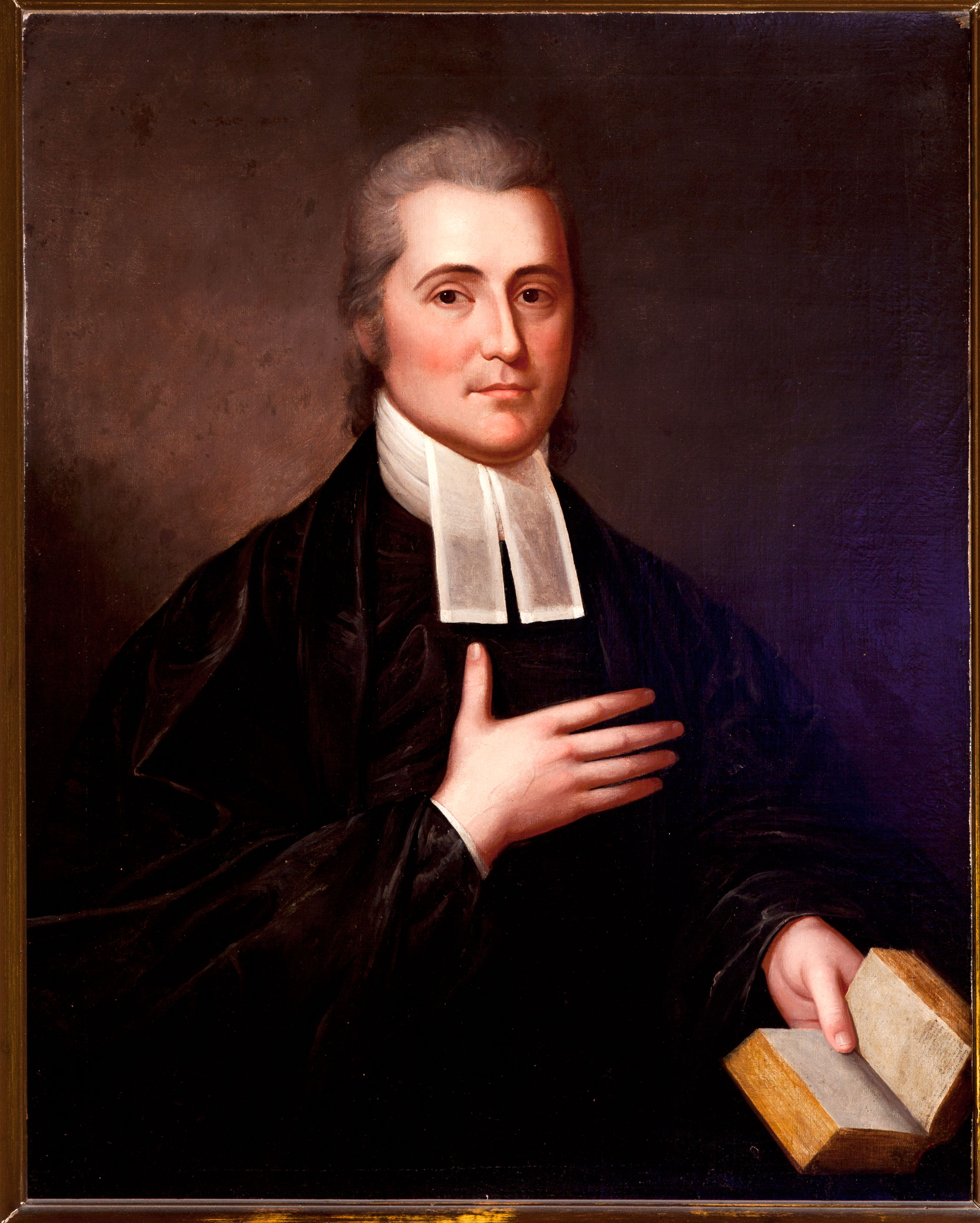
Philip Milledoler born 22 September

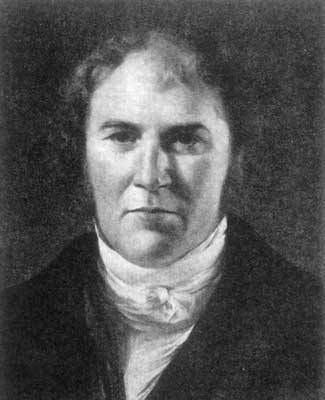
Robert Adrain born 30 September

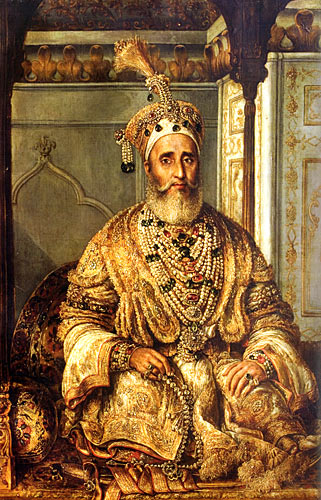
Bahadur Shah Zafar born 24 October

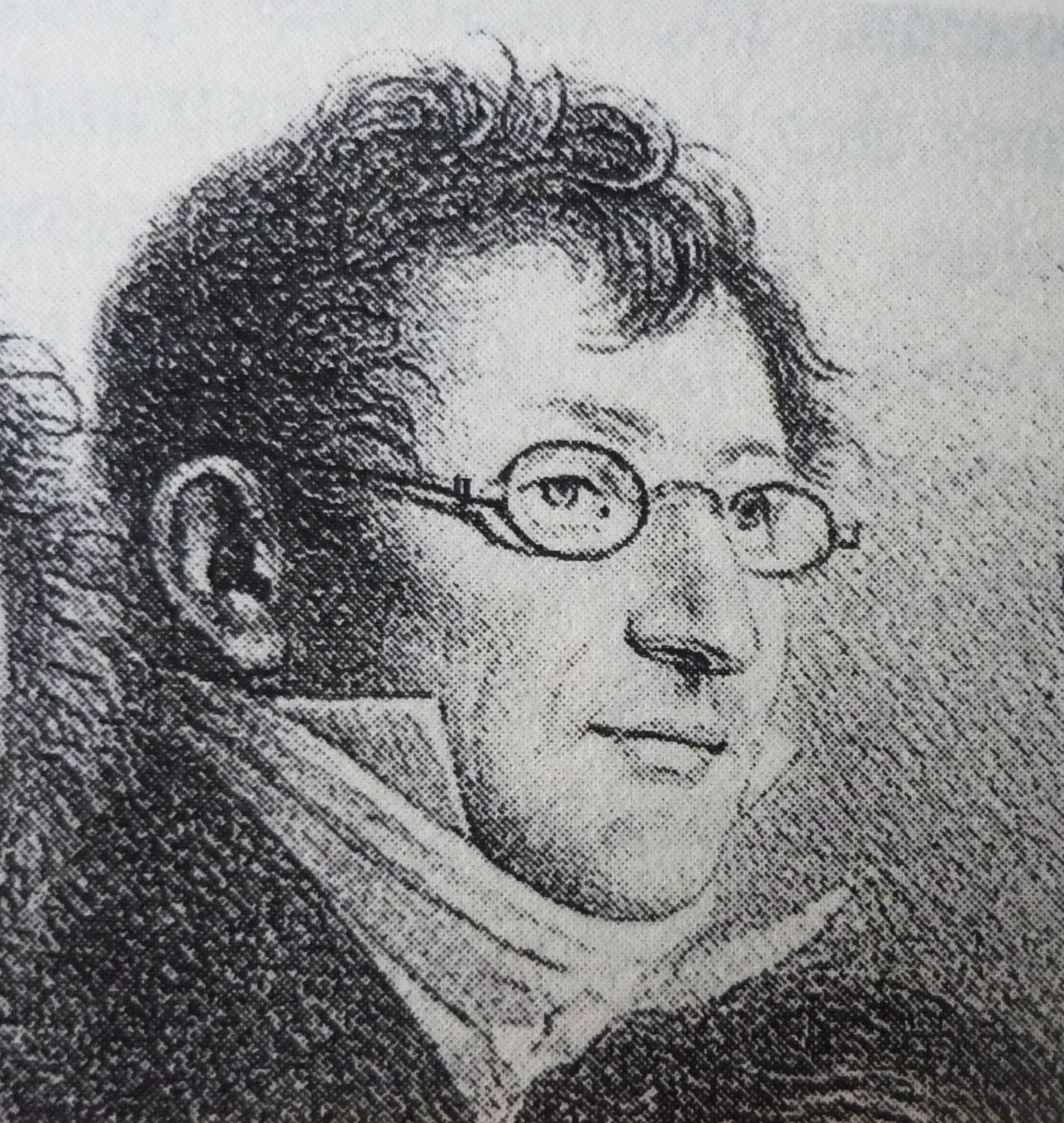
Pierre Capelle born 4 November

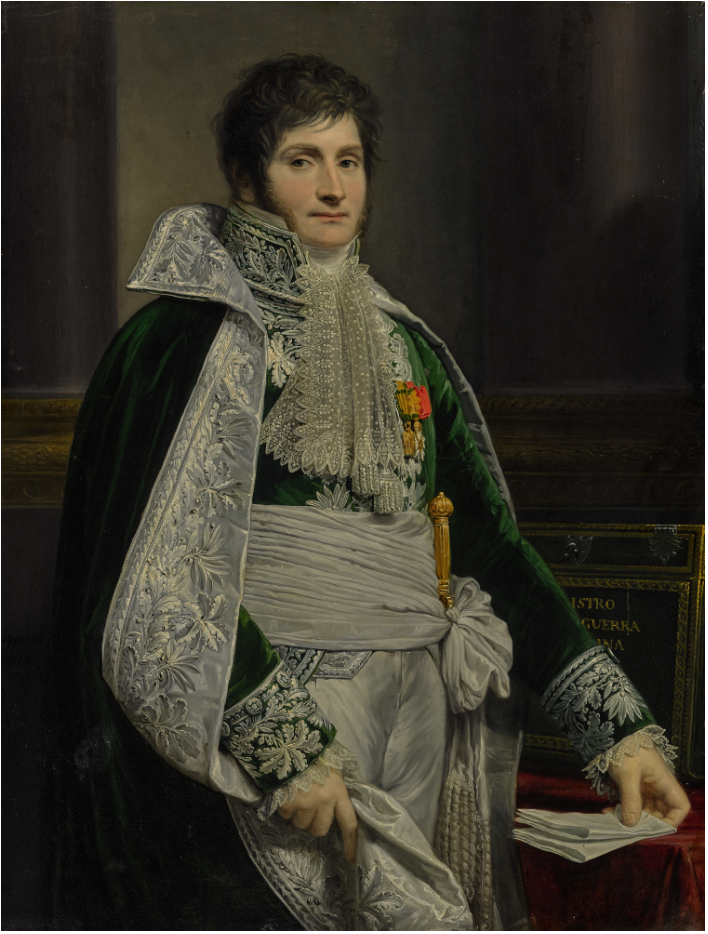
Achille Fontanelli born 8 November

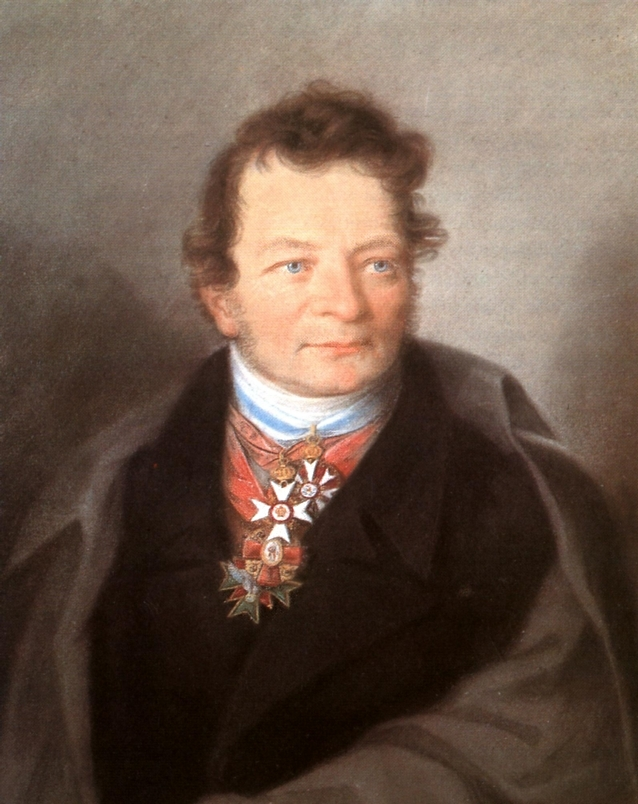
Paul Johann Anselm Ritter von Feuerbach born 14 November

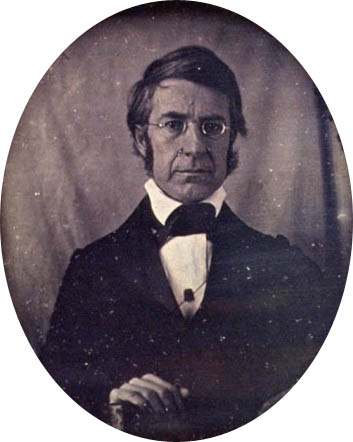
James Carnahan born 15 November

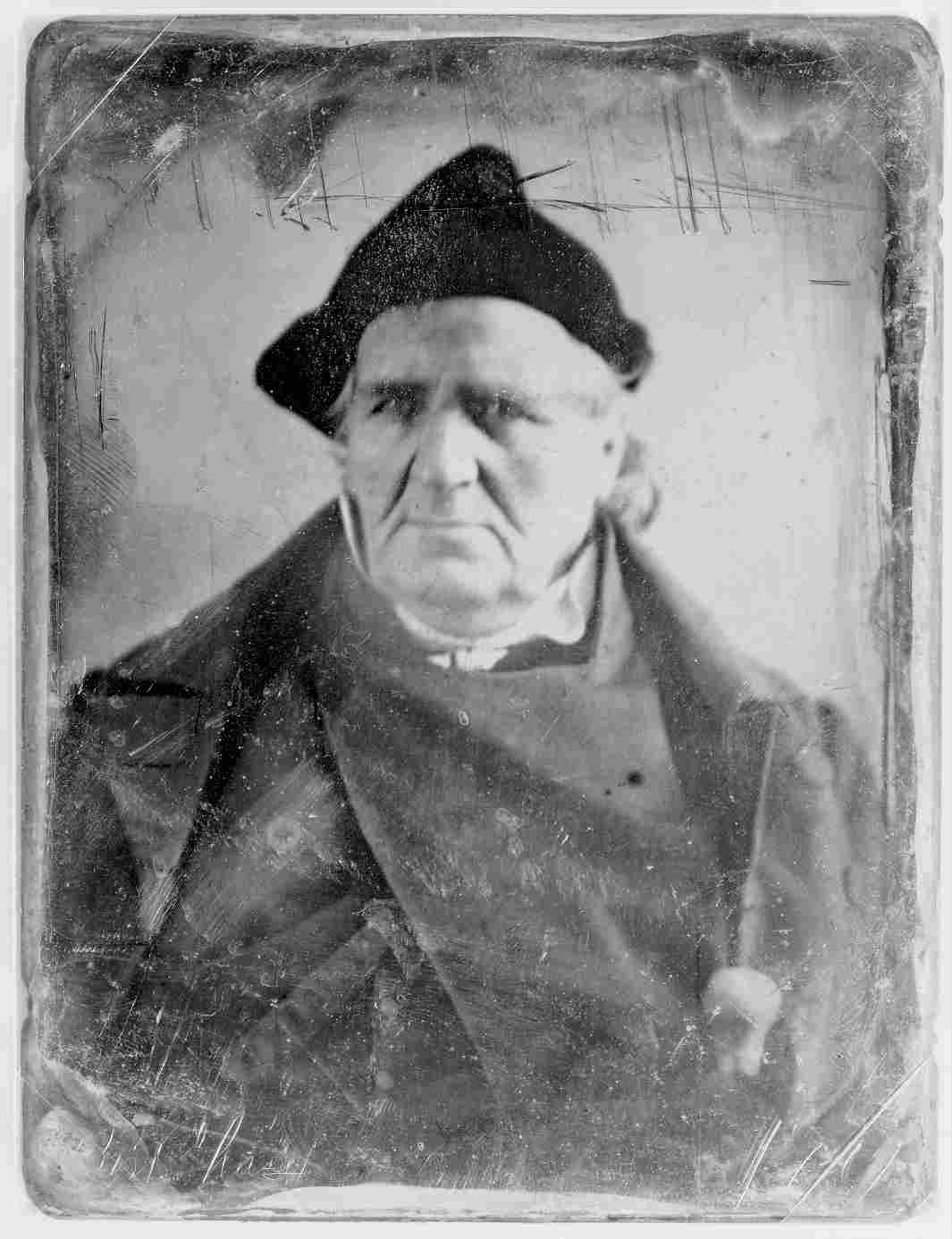
Philander Chase born 14 December

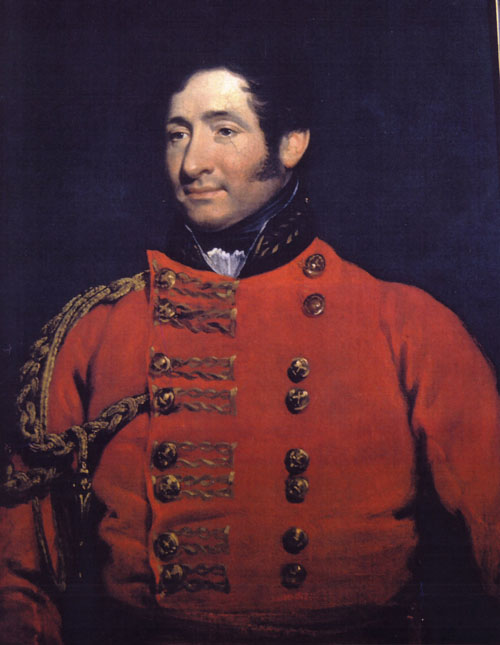
Phineas Riall born 15 December

=== January–March ===
- January 2 – Henry Tufton, 11th Earl of Thanet, English cricketer (d. 1849)
- January 3 – Francis Caulfeild, 2nd Earl of Charlemont, Irish politician (d. 1863)
- January 4
  - George Weare Braikenridge, English antiquarian (d. 1856)
  - Carlo, Duke of Calabria, Italian prince (d. 1778)
- January 6
  - Date Narimura, Japanese daimyō (d. 1796)
  - Horace St Paul, English soldier and Member of Parliament (d. 1840)
- January 7 – Thomas Amyot, English antiquarian (d. 1850)
- January 9
  - Juan Francisco Larrobla, Uruguayan politician (d. 1842)
  - Antonio Villavicencio, statesman and soldier of New Granada (d. 1816)
- January 10 – James Sewall Morsell, United States federal judge (d. 1870)
- January 13 – Stanisław Kostka Zamoyski, Polish noble (d. 1856)
- January 15 – Giosuè Sangiovanni, Italian zoologist (d. 1849)
- January 18
  - Pedro Moreno, Mexican soldier (d. 1817)
  - Evelyn Pierrepont, British Member of Parliament (d. 1801)
- January 19
  - Hudson Gurney, English antiquary and verse-writer (d. 1864)
  - George Pyke, Canadian politician (d. 1851)
- January 20 – André-Marie Ampère, French physicist and mathematician (d. 1836)
- January 22
  - Manuel García, Spanish singer, teacher and composer (d. 1832)
- January 23
  - Pietro Colletta, Neapolitan general and historian (d. 1831)
  - José Fernández Salvador, Ecuadorian politician and jurist (d. 1853)
  - John Rubens Smith, London-born painter (d. 1849)
- January 27 – Friedrich Wilhelm Joseph Schelling, German philosopher (d. 1854)
- January 28
  - Lady Charlotte Bury, English novelist (d. 1861)
  - James Brown Mason, American medical doctor and legislator (d. 1819)
- January 30 – Walter Savage Landor, English writer and poet (d. 1864)
- January 31
  - Giordano Bianchi Dottula, Italian writer and politician (d. 1846)
  - John Richard Farre, English medical doctor (d. 1862)
- February 1
  - Philippe de Girard, French engineer and inventor of the first flax spinning frame in 1810 (d. 1845)
  - Jochum Nicolay Müller, Norwegian naval officer who (d. 1848)
- February 2 – Gurun Princess Hexiao of the Manchu dynasty (d. 1823)
- February 3
  - Maximilien Sébastien Foy, French military leader (d. 1825)
  - Louis-François Lejeune, French general, painter and printmaker (d. 1848)
- February 8
  - Jacob Liv Borch Sverdrup, Norwegian educator (d. 1841)
  - Antonio Bertoloni, Italian botanist who made extensive studies of Italian plants (d. 1869)
  - Thomas Liddell, 1st Baron Ravensworth, British politician (d. 1855)
- February 9
  - Farkas Bolyai, Hungarian mathematician (d. 1856)
  - Theodor Hell, pseudonym of Karl Gottfried Theodor Winkler, German man of letters (d. 1856)
- February 10
  - Charles Lamb, English essayist (d. 1834)
  - James Wilkes Maurice, British Royal Navy officer during the French Revolutionary and Napoleonic Wars (d. 1857)
  - Ádám Récsey, Prime Minister of Hungary (October 3–7, 1848) (d. 1852)
- February 11 – William Hall, American politician (d. 1856)
- February 12 – Charles Lloyd, English poet (d. 1839)
- February 14 – William Clift, English medical illustrator and conservator (d. 1849)
- February 15
  - Paul Allen, American author and editor (d. 1826)
  - Miguel Ramos Arizpe, Mexican priest (d. 1843)
- February 17
  - Heinrich Jacob Aldenrath, German portrait painter (d. 1844)
  - Frederick Garling, English attorney and solicitor (d. 1848)
- February 18 – Thomas Girtin, English painter and etcher (d. 1802)
- February 19
  - John Bibby, founder of the British Bibby Line shipping company (d. 1840)
  - Giovanni Battista Comolli, Italian sculptor (d. 1831)
- February 20
  - Guy-Victor Duperré, French naval officer and Admiral of France (d. 1846)
  - Israel Gregg, first captain of the historic American steamboat Enterprise (1814) (d. 1847)
  - John Starr, merchant and political figure in Nova Scotia (d. 1827)
- February 21
  - Jean-Baptiste Girard, French soldier (d. 1815)
  - Claudius Herrick, American educator and minister (d. 1831)
- February 22
  - William Seymour, United States Representative from New York (d. 1848)
- February 24
  - Claudius Hunter, Lord Mayor of London (d. 1851)
  - Matěj Kopecký, Czech puppeteer (d. 1847)
  - Edward St Maur, 11th Duke of Somerset, English landowner and amateur mathematician (d. 1855)
- February 25 – John Caldwell, businessman and politician in Lower Canada (d. 1842)
- February 26 – Adolf Stieler, German cartographer and lawyer (d. 1836)
- February 28 – Sophie Tieck, German poet (d. 1833)
- March 3 – Henry Prittie, 2nd Baron Dunalley, British politician (d. 1854)
- March 4 – Johann Baptist von Lampi the Younger, Austrian portrait painter (d. 1837)
- March 5
  - Charlotte Richardson, English poet (d. 1825)
  - Adam Elias von Siebold, German gynecologist (d. 1828)
- March 9
  - Jean Kickx, Belgian botanist and mineralogist (d. 1831)
  - Constance Mayer, French painter (d. 1821)
- March 10
  - Marc-Antoine Jullien de Paris, French journalist (d. 1848)
  - Sir David Wedderburn, 1st Baronet, Scottish businessman and politician (d. 1858)
- March 11
  - Nils Landmark, Norwegian politician (d. 1859)
  - Pierre Jean François Turpin, French botanist and illustrator (d. 1840)
- March 12
  - Joseph Chitty, English lawyer and legal writer (d. 1841)
  - Henry Eckford, Scottish-born American shipbuilder, naval architect, industrial engineer, entrepreneur (d. 1832)
  - Michel Grendahl, Norwegian politician (d. 1849)
  - James Welsh, English officer in the Madras Army of the East India Company (d. 1861)
- March 14 – Samuel Street Jr., businessman in Upper Canada (d. 1844)
- March 15 – Juan Bautista Arismendi, Venezuelan patriot and general of the Venezuelan War of Independence (d. 1841)
- March 17 – Ninian Edwards, founding political figure of the state of Illinois (d. 1833)
- March 19 – Ramsay Richard Reinagle, English painter (d. 1862)
- March 22
  - Johan Collett, Norwegian politician and public administrator (d. 1827)
  - Jack Crawford, British Royal Navy sailor, "Hero of Camperdown" (d. 1831)
  - Armand Gouffé, French poet (d. 1845)
- March 23 – William Haseldine Pepys, English physical scientist (d. 1856)
- March 24
  - Pauline Auzou, French painter and art instructor (d. 1835)
  - Pierre Berthezène, French Army general (d. 1847)
  - Muthuswami Dikshitar, South Indian poet and composer (d. 1835)
- March 25 – John Johnston, United States Indian agent (d. 1861)
- March 26 – Thomas Monteagle Bayly, Virginian politician, lawyer and planter (d. 1834)
- March 27 – Nicolai Abraham Holten, Danish civil servant and director of Øresund Custom House (d. 1850)
- March 28 – Johann Heinrich Gossler, Hamburg banker and grand burgher (d. 1842)
- March 30 – Hieronymus Karl Graf von Colloredo-Mansfeld, Austrian corps commander during the Napoleonic Wars (d. 1822)

=== April–June ===
- April 2
  - John Higton, English animal painter (d. 1827)
  - Calvin Jones, American politician (d. 1846)
  - Moses Walton, Virginia farmer serving in both houses of the Virginia General Assembly (d. 1847)
- April 4 – Dutch Sam, British boxer (d. 1816)
- April 5 – Johann Nepomuk Rust, Austrian surgeon (d. 1840)
- April 6 – Edward Wynne-Pendarves, English politician (d. 1853)
- April 7
  - Eliza Jumel, American socialite (d. 1865)
  - Francis Cabot Lowell, American businessman (d. 1817)
  - Louis Barbe Charles Sérurier, French diplomat (d. 1860)
- April 8
  - Antoine Charles Cazenove, Swiss-American businessman and diplomat (d. 1852)
  - Adam Albert von Neipperg, Austrian general and statesman (d. 1829)
  - Thomas Powys, 2nd Baron Lilford, British peer (d. 1825)
- April 9 – Martim Francisco Ribeiro de Andrada, Brazilian politician, leader in Brazil's independence and government (d. 1844)
- April 10 – Carl Wigand Maximilian Jacobi, German psychiatrist (d. 1858)
- April 12
  - Christian Samuel Theodor Bernd, German linguist and heraldist (d. 1854)
  - Vito Nunziante, Italian general (d. 1836)
- April 13 – Adolph Henke, German medical doctor (d. 1843)
- April 14
  - Karl Becker, German philologist (d. 1849)
  - John Philip, Scottish-born missionary in South Africa (d. 1851)
- April 16
  - Sylvester Maxwell, American lawyer and legislator (d. 1858)
  - Charles Stewart, English Anglican bishop in Lower Canada (d. 1837)
- April 21
  - Alexander Anderson, American medical doctor and illustrator (d. 1870)
  - Edward Smith-Stanley, 13th Earl of Derby, British politician (d. 1851)
- April 22
  - Georg Hermes, German Roman Catholic theologian (d. 1831)
  - Henry Ryan, US-Canadian Methodist minister (d. 1833)
- April 23 – J. M. W. Turner, English Romantic landscape painter, watercolourist and printmaker (d. 1851)
- April 25
  - William Warren Baldwin, Canadian politician (d. 1844)
  - Alexander Johnston, Sri Lankan judge (d. 1849)
  - Carlota Joaquina of Spain, Queen consort of Portugal (d. 1830)
- April 27 – Pietro Ostini, Catholic cardinal (d. 1849)
- April 28
  - William Capel, English sportsman and clergyman (d. 1854)
  - Loftus William Otway, British Napoleonic Wars general (d. 1835)
- April 29 – Samuel King, American Presbyterian minister, a founder of the Cumberland Presbyterian Church (d. 1842)
- April 30
  - Guillaume Dode de la Brunerie, Marshal of France (d. 1851)
  - Calvin Fillmore, American farmer and politician from New York (d. 1865)
  - George Kinloch, Scottish reformer and politician (d. 1833)
- May 1 – Angélique Mongez, French Neoclassical artist (d. 1855)
- May 3 – John Hansen Sørbrøden, Norwegian farmer (d. 1857)
- May 5
  - Marie-Anne Calame, Swiss vitreous enamel miniaturist and pietist philanthropic educator (d. 1834)
  - Johann Christoph Friedrich Klug, German entomologist (d. 1856)
  - Alexander McNair, American frontiersman and politician (d. 1826)
  - Pablo Morillo, Spanish general (d. 1837)
- May 6
  - Hans Henrich Maschmann, Norwegian pharmacist (d. 1860)
  - Mary Martha Sherwood, English children's author (d. 1851)
- May 8 – George Gwilt the younger, English architect (d. 1856)
- May 9 – Jacob Brown, United States general (d. 1828)
- May 10
  - Antoine Charles Louis de Lasalle, French cavalry general during the Revolutionary and Napoleonic Wars (d. 1809)
  - William Phillips, English mineralogist and geologist (d. 1828)
- May 12 – George Whitmore, British Army general (d. 1862)
- May 14 – Micah Brooks, United States general (d. 1857)
- May 17
  - Sir John Beckett, 2nd Baronet, British politician (d. 1847)
  - Daniel LeRoy, Attorney General for the Michigan Territory (d. 1858)
- May 19 – Antonín Jan Jungmann, Czech medical doctor (d. 1854)
- May 21 – Lucien Bonaparte, French statesman (d. 1840)
- May 24
  - Sir Charles Ogle, 2nd Baronet, British Royal Navy officer (d. 1858)
  - Matthew Whitworth-Aylmer, 5th Baron Aylmer, British Army general (d. 1850)
- May 25 – Pelagio Palagi, Italian painter (d. 1860)
- May 28 – Thomas Graves, 2nd Baron Graves, British politician (d. 1830)
- May 29 – Nathan Cutler, American politician from Maine (d. 1861)
- May 31
  - Charles Digby, British clergyman, Canon of Windsor from 1808 (d. 1841)
  - Charles Jackson, American lawyer and jurist (d. 1855)
- June 4 – Francesco Molino, Italian guitarist (d. 1847)
- June 8 – Henry Boehm, American clergyman and pastor (d. 1875)
- June 9 – Georg Friedrich Grotefend, German epigraphist and philologist (d. 1853)
- June 10 – James Barbour, American politician (d. 1842)
- June 12
  - Francis Bloodgood, American lawyer, mayor of Albany (d. 1840)
  - Johann Baptist Malfatti von Monteregio, Italian-born medical doctor (d. 1859)
  - Karl Freiherr von Müffling, Prussian Generalfeldmarschall (d. 1851)
- June 13 – Antoni Radziwiłł, Polish politician (d. 1833)
- June 14 – André Bruno de Frévol de Lacoste, French general of the First Empire (d. 1809)
- June 15
  - Elizabeth Benger, English biographer (d. 1827)
  - Paul Delano, American-born sea captain (d. 1842)
  - Carlo Porta, Italian poet (d. 1821)
- June 16 – Judah Touro, American businessman (d. 1854)
- June 17 – Alexander Cowan, Scottish papermaker and philanthropist (d. 1859)
- June 18 – Orsamus Cook Merrill, American politician (d. 1865)
- June 19
  - Vardry McBee, American saddlemaker and philanthropist (d. 1864)
  - Friedrich August Peter von Colomb, German general (d. 1854)
- June 20 – Jacques Frédéric Français, French engineer and mathematician (d. 1833)
- June 22
  - Johannes Flüggé, German botanist and medical doctor (d. 1816)
  - Camillo Ranzani, Italian priest and a naturalist (d. 1841)
- June 24 – John Kempthorne, English clergyman and hymnwriter (d. 1838)
- June 25 – John Stevenson Salt, English barrister, banker and landowner (d. 1845)
- June 26
  - Jean-Jacques Desvaux de Saint-Maurice, French general of the Napoleonic Wars (d. 1815)
  - John Swaine, English draughtsman and engraver (d. 1860)
- June 29 – Thomas Boyle, American privateer (d. 1825)
- June 30 – William Thompson, Irish philosopher (d. 1833)

=== July–September ===
- July 1 – Cephas Thompson, American artist (d. 1856)
- July 2 – Aaron Peasley, American buttonmaker (d. 1837)
- July 3 – Antoine Philippe, Duke of Montpensier, member of the French royal family (d. 1807)
- July 5 – William Crotch, English composer, organist and artist (d. 1847)
- July 8
  - William Davies, United States federal judge (d. 1829)
  - Lucy Mack Smith, American prominent in the Latter Day Saints, mother of Joseph Smith (d. 1856)
- July 9 – Matthew "Monk" Lewis, English Gothic horror writer and politician (d. 1818)
- July 11 – Joseph Blanco White, Spanish-born political thinker, theologian and poet (d. 1841)
- July 14
  - Louis Ducis, French painter (d. 1847)
  - Berkeley Guise, British landowner and Member of Parliament (d. 1834)
- July 15
  - George Schonswar, British politician (d. 1859)
  - Richard Westmacott, British sculptor (d. 1856)
- July 17
  - Domingo Eyzaguirre, Chilean politician and philanthropist (d. 1854)
  - August Harder, German musician (d. 1813)
- July 18
  - Pierre Decouz, French military officer (d. of wounds 1814)
  - Karl von Rotteck, German political activist (d. 1840)
- July 19
  - Camillo Borghese, 6th Prince of Sulmona (d. 1832)
  - John Andrew Shulze, Pennsylvania political leader, sixth Governor of Pennsylvania (d. 1852)
- July 21
  - Edward Heneage, English first-class cricketer (d. 1810)
  - George Osborne, 6th Duke of Leeds, English peer and politician (d. 1838)
- July 23
  - Carl Ludwig Wilhelm Grolman, German jurist (d. 1829)
  - Étienne-Louis Malus, French officer (d. 1812)
- July 24 – Eugène François Vidocq, French criminal and private detective agent (d. 1857)
- July 25 – Anna Harrison, American politician (d. 1864)
- July 27 – Therese Brunsvik, Hungarian educationalist (d. 1861)
- July 28 – Hussey Vivian, 1st Baron Vivian, British Army general (d. 1842)
- July 31 – Emmanuel Dupaty, French singer and writer (d. 1851)
- August 2
  - William Henry Ireland, English forger (d. 1835)
  - José Ángel Lamas, Venezuelan classical musician and composer born in Caracas (d. 1814)
- August 6
  - Louis Antoine, Duke of Angoulême, last Dauphin of France (d. 1844)
  - Daniel O'Connell, Ireland's predominant political leader (d. 1847)
  - Hendrik van Oort, Northern Netherlandish painter (d. 1847)
- August 7
  - Maria Brizzi Giorgi, Italian organist (d. 1812)
  - Jacob Hoel, Norwegian farmer (d. 1847)
  - Henriette Lorimier, popular portraitist in Paris at the beginning of Romanticism (d. 1854)
- August 8 – Richard Blakemore, English politician (d. 1855)
- August 9 – Jacob Brown, United States general (d. 1828)
- August 12 – Conrad Malte-Brun, Danish-born geographer and writer on French politics (d. 1826)
- August 14 – Pieter Adrianus Ossewaarde, Dutch politician (d. 1853)
- August 15
  - Carlos de España, Spanish general (d. 1839)
  - Carl Franz Anton Ritter von Schreibers, Austrian naturalist, native of Pressburg (d. 1852)
- August 16
  - John Carlyle Herbert, American politician (d. 1846)
  - Ebenezer Sage, American politician (d. 1834)
- August 18
  - James Elliot, American politician (d. 1839)
  - Johann Leonhard Pfaff, bishop of the German Roman Catholic Diocese of Fulda from 1832 (d. 1848)
- August 20
  - Franz Dinnendahl, German mechanical engineer (d. 1826)
  - George Tucker, American politician (d. 1861)
- August 22
  - François Péron, French naturalist and explorer (d. 1810)
  - August von Vécsey, Austro-Hungarian general (d. 1857)
- August 23 – Mark Cubbon, British army officer with the East India Company (d. 1861)
- August 25 – Karl Joseph Hieronymus Windischmann, German philosopher and anthropologist (d. 1839)
- August 26 – William Joseph Behr, German political radical (d. 1851)
- August 27
  - Frederick Graff, American hydraulic engineer (d. 1847)
  - Jan Verveer, major general of the Royal Netherlands Army (d. 1838)
- August 28
  - Antoine Marc Augustin Bertoletti, Italian general (d. 1846)
  - Sophie Gail, French singer and composer (d. 1819)
- August 29 – Niels Wulfsberg, Norwegian publisher (d. 1852)
- August 31
  - Agnes Bulmer, English epic poet (d. 1836)
  - François de Fossa, French classical guitarist and composer (d. 1849)
- September 1 – Honoré Charles Reille, French general, Marshal of France (d. 1860)
- September 4 – Jean-François Le Gonidec, Breton linguist, Bible translator (d. 1838)
- September 5
  - Juan Martín Díez, El Empecinado, Spanish military leader (d. 1825)
  - Adolph Ferdinand Gehlen, German chemist (d. 1815)
- September 6 – Aleksey Greig, Russian admiral (d. 1845)
- September 7 – John Jebb, Irish Anglican bishop and religious writer (d. 1833)
- September 8
  - John Leyden, Scottish orientalist (d. 1811)
  - Vasily Orlov-Denisov, Cossack Russian general (d. 1843)
- September 9
  - Guillaume Capelle, French administrator and politician (d. 1843)
  - Francisco Ramón Vicuña, President of Chile (d. 1849)
- September 10
  - John Kidd, English medical doctor, chemist and geologist (d. 1851)
  - Murray Maxwell, British Royal Navy officer (d. 1831)
- September 11
  - Narciso Fernández de Heredia, 2nd Count of Heredia-Spínola, Prime Minister of Spain (d. 1847)
  - Ferdinand August Freiherr von Hügel, general in the royal Württemberg Infantry (d. 1834)
- September 12 – Josef Jüttner, Austrian cartographer and military officer (d. 1848)
- September 13 – Laura Secord, Canadian heroine of the War of 1812 (d. 1868)
- September 14
  - Jean-Louis Burnouf, French philologist and translator (d. 1844)
  - John Henry Hobart, third Episcopal bishop of New York from 1816 (d. 1830)
  - Joseph Phillimore, English lawyer and Member of Parliament (d. 1855)
- September 15 – William A. Griswold, American lawyer and politician (d. 1846)
- September 16
  - Hermano José Braamcamp de Almeida Castelo Branco, Portuguese nobleman and politician (d. 1846)
  - Giuseppe Rosaroll, Italian essayist and general in the army of the Kingdom of the Two Sicilies (d. 1825)
  - Christian Friedrich Schwägrichen, German botanist specializing in the field of bryology (d. 1853)
- September 17
  - Georges Roffavier, French botanist (d. 1866)
  - Margrethe Schall, Danish ballerina (d. 1852)
- September 19 – José Félix Ribas, hero of the Venezuelan War of Independence (d. 1815)
- September 20 – François-Pierre Chaumeton, French botanist and medical doctor (d. 1819)
- September 22 – Philip Milledoler, American protestant minister and fifth President of Rutgers College (d. 1852)
- September 23 – Jens Christian Berg, Norwegian lawyer and historian (d. 1852)
- September 24 – Nathan Heald, officer in the United States Army during the War of 1812 (d. 1832)
- September 25 – Pierre Flor, Norwegian politician (d. 1848)
- September 26 – James Grimston, 1st Earl of Verulam, British peer and Member of Parliament (d. 1845)
- September 29
  - David McConaughy, American pastor and fourth president of Washington College from 1831 to 1852 (d. 1852)
  - François Michel de Rozière, French mining engineer and mineralogist (d. 1842)
  - Herbert Taylor, British Army officer (d. 1839)
- September 30 – Robert Adrain, Irish-born American mathematician (d. 1843)

=== October–December ===
- October 2 – Cornelius O'Callaghan, 1st Viscount Lismore, Irish politician (d. 1857)
- October 3 – Isaac von Sinclair, German writer and diplomat (d. 1815)
- October 6 – Johann Anton André, German composer and music publisher (d. 1842)
- October 7
  - Ramón Power y Giralt, Puerto Rican politician and Spanish admiral (d. 1813)
  - Jaygopal Tarkalankar, Bengali writer and Sanskrit scholar (d. 1846)
- October 9
  - Sir Alexander Boswell, 1st Baronet, British politician (d. 1822)
  - Lars Johannes Irgens, Norwegian jurist and public official (d. 1830)
  - Peter Thonning, Danish medical doctor and botanist (d. 1848)
  - Charles Williams-Wynn, British politician (d. 1850)
- October 12
  - Lyman Beecher, American Presbyterian minister and patriarch (d. 1863)
  - Ludovico Micara, Italian Catholic cardinal (d. 1847)
- October 13 – John Wentworth Loring, British Royal Navy admiral (d. 1852)
- October 14 – Godfrey Macdonald, 3rd Baron Macdonald of Sleat, Scottish general (d. 1832)
- October 15
  - Bernhard Crusell, Swedish-Finnish clarinetist and composer 1838)
  - Alberto Lista, Spanish poet and educationalist (d. 1848)
  - Bernardo Peres da Silva, governor of Portuguese India (d. 1844)
- October 17 – Ole Paulssøn Haagenstad, Norwegian politician (d. 1866)
- October 18
  - Martial Aubertin, French stage actor and dramatist (d. 1824)
  - Dawson Turner, English banker and botanist (d. 1858)
  - John Vanderlyn, American artist (d. 1852)
- October 19
  - Jean-Baptiste Faribault, Lower Canadian trader with the Indians and early settler in Minnesota (d. 1860)
  - Kamma Rahbek, Danish salon holder (d. 1829)
- October 21
  - Giuseppe Baini, Italian priest, music critic and composer (d. 1844)
  - Bartholomew Crannell Beardsley, Canadian politician, lawyer and judge (d. 1855)
- October 23 – Gottlob Friedrich Thormeyer, German architect (d. 1842)
- October 24 – Bahadur Shah II, Mughal emperor (d. 1862)
- October 26
  - Charles Douglas, 3rd Baron Douglas, English amateur cricketer (d. 1848)
  - Hans Moritz Hauke, German-Polish general (d. 1830)
  - Joseph Nightingale, prolific English writer and preacher (d. 1824)
  - Alexander Thom, Scottish military surgeon, judge and politician in Upper Canada (d. 1845)
- October 30
  - Catterino Cavos, Russian composer (d. 1840)
  - Wilhelm Ludwig Viktor Henckel von Donnersmarck, Prussian officer who fought in the Napoleonic Wars (d. 1849)
- November 1 – Christian Adolph Diriks, Norwegian lawyer and statesman (d. 1837)
- November 2
  - Jean-Emmanuel Jobez, French businessman and politician (d. 1828)
  - Jeromus Johnson, American politician (d. 1846)
- November 3 – Edward Paget, British Army general (d. 1849)
- November 4 – Pierre Capelle, French chansonnier (d. 1851)
- November 6 – August Wilhelm Hartmann, Danish composer (d. 1850)
- November 7 – Joseph Fox, English dental surgeon (d. 1816)
- November 8
  - Achille Fontanelli, Italian nationalist and Napoleonic general (d. 1838)
  - Jacob Peter Mynster, Danish theologian and Bishop of Zealand (d. 1854)
- November 9 – Daniel Waldron, American businessman (d. 1821)
- November 10 – James Elliot, American politician (d. 1839)
- November 11 – Gulbrand Eriksen Tandberg, Norwegian farmer and politician (d. 1848)
- November 13
  - John Burns, Scottish surgeon (d. 1850)
  - Richard Butler, 1st Earl of Glengall, Irish peer (d. 1819)
  - Rémi Joseph Isidore Exelmans, distinguished French soldier of the Revolutionary and Napoleonic Wars (d. 1852)
- November 14 – Paul Johann Anselm Ritter von Feuerbach, German legal scholar (d. 1833)
- November 15 – James Carnahan, American clergyman and educator, ninth President of Princeton University (d. 1859)
- November 19
  - Johann Karl Wilhelm Illiger, German entomologist and zoologist (d. 1813)
  - François Antoine Teste, French officer during the Napoleonic Wars (d. 1862)
- November 20 – Gustav Anton von Seckendorff, German author (d. 1823)
- November 21 – Josef Servas d'Outrepont, German obstetrician (d. 1845)
- November 23
  - Clemens Wenzeslaus Coudray, German neoclassical architect (d. 1845)
  - Johann Georg Rist, Danish author (d. 1847)
  - Maria Anna of Naples and Sicily, member of the French Royal Family (d. 1780)
- November 24 – Peter Buell Allen, politician and military commander in New York State, pioneer of Vigo County and Terre Haute (d. 1833)
- November 25
  - Joseph Borremans, Belgian composer (d. 1858)
  - Michel Étienne Descourtilz, French medical doctor, botanist and historiographer of the Haitian revolution (d. 1835)
  - Jean Baptiste Godart, French entomologist (d. 1825)
  - Gustaf Gabriel Hällström, Finnish scientist (d. 1844)
  - Charles Kemble, Welsh-born English actor of a prominent theatre family (d. 1854)
- November 27
  - Jean-Françoìs de Dompierre de Jonquières, Dutch-Danish merchant (d. 1820)
  - Lauritz Weidemann, Norwegian politician (d. 1856)
- November 28
  - William Frere, English lawyer and academic (d. 1836)
  - Jean-Charles Létourneau, notary and political figure in Lower Canada (d. 1838)
- November 29 – Marie Antoine de Reiset, French general during the French Revolutionary Wars and the Napoleonic Wars (d. 1836)
- November 30 – Jean Joseph Antoine de Courvoisier, French magistrate and politician (d. 1835)
- December 2 – Joseph Denis Odevaere, Neo-Classical painter from the Southern Netherlands (modern-day Belgium) (d. 1830)
- December 5 – Abijah Bigelow, American politician (d. 1860)
- December 6
  - Sir Charles Blunt, 4th Baronet, British Member of Parliament (d. 1840)
  - Nicolas Isouard, Maltese composer (d. 1818)
- December 10
  - José María de la Cueva, 14th Duke of Albuquerque, Spanish general and ambassador (d. 1811)
  - Giacomo Filippo Fransoni, Catholic cardinal (d. 1856)
  - Jacques-Antoine Manuel, French lawyer (d. 1827)
- December 11 – Peter Little, American politician (d. 1830)
- December 13 – Theodor Gottlieb von Hippel the Younger, Prussian statesman (d. 1843)
- December 14
  - Philander Chase, American Episcopal Church bishop, educator and pioneer (d. 1852)
  - Thomas Cochrane, 10th Earl of Dundonald, British Royal Navy admiral (d. 1860)
- December 15 – Phineas Riall, British Army general (d. 1850)
- December 16
  - Ciro Annunchiarico, Italian cult leader (d. 1817)
  - Jane Austen, English novelist (d. 1817)
  - François-Adrien Boïeldieu, French composer (d. 1834)
  - John Fullerton, Lord Fullerton, Scottish judge (d. 1853)
- December 17 – Carlo Rossi, Russian architect (d. 1849)
- December 20
  - Samuel Farrow, American politician (d. 1824)
  - Pierre Antoine François Huber, brigadier general in the French army (d. 1832)
- December 21 – Julien-Joseph Virey, French naturalist and anthropologist (d. 1846)
- December 25
  - John Fitzgerald, British Member of Parliament (d. 1852)
  - Peter Reesor, American-born Mennonite settler in Ontario (d. 1854)
  - Antun Sorkočević, Croatian composer, writer and diplomat (d. 1841)
- December 26 – Anton Carl Ludwig von Tabouillot, French officer, nobleman and counter-revolutionary (d. 1813)
- December 28
  - João Domingos Bomtempo, Portuguese musician (d. 1842)
  - Jean-Gabriel Eynard, Swiss banker (d. 1863)
  - Pierre François Étienne Bouvet de Maisonneuve, French admiral (d. 1860)
- Date unknown – Jeanne Geneviève Garnerin, French balloonist and parachutist (d. 1847)

== Deaths ==
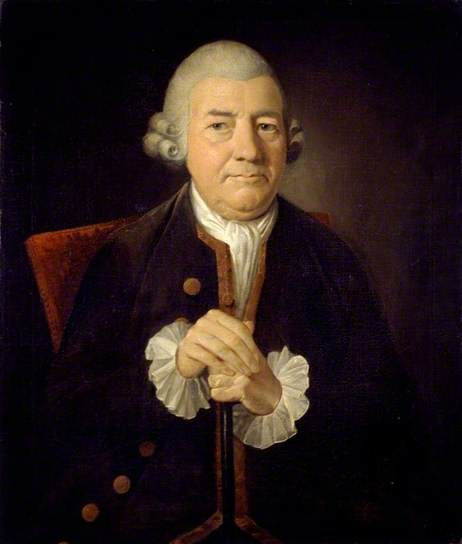
John Baskerville died 8 January

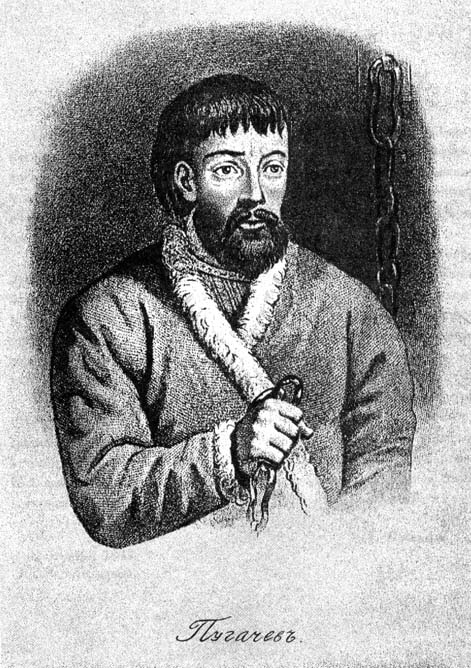
Yemelyan Pugachev died 10 January

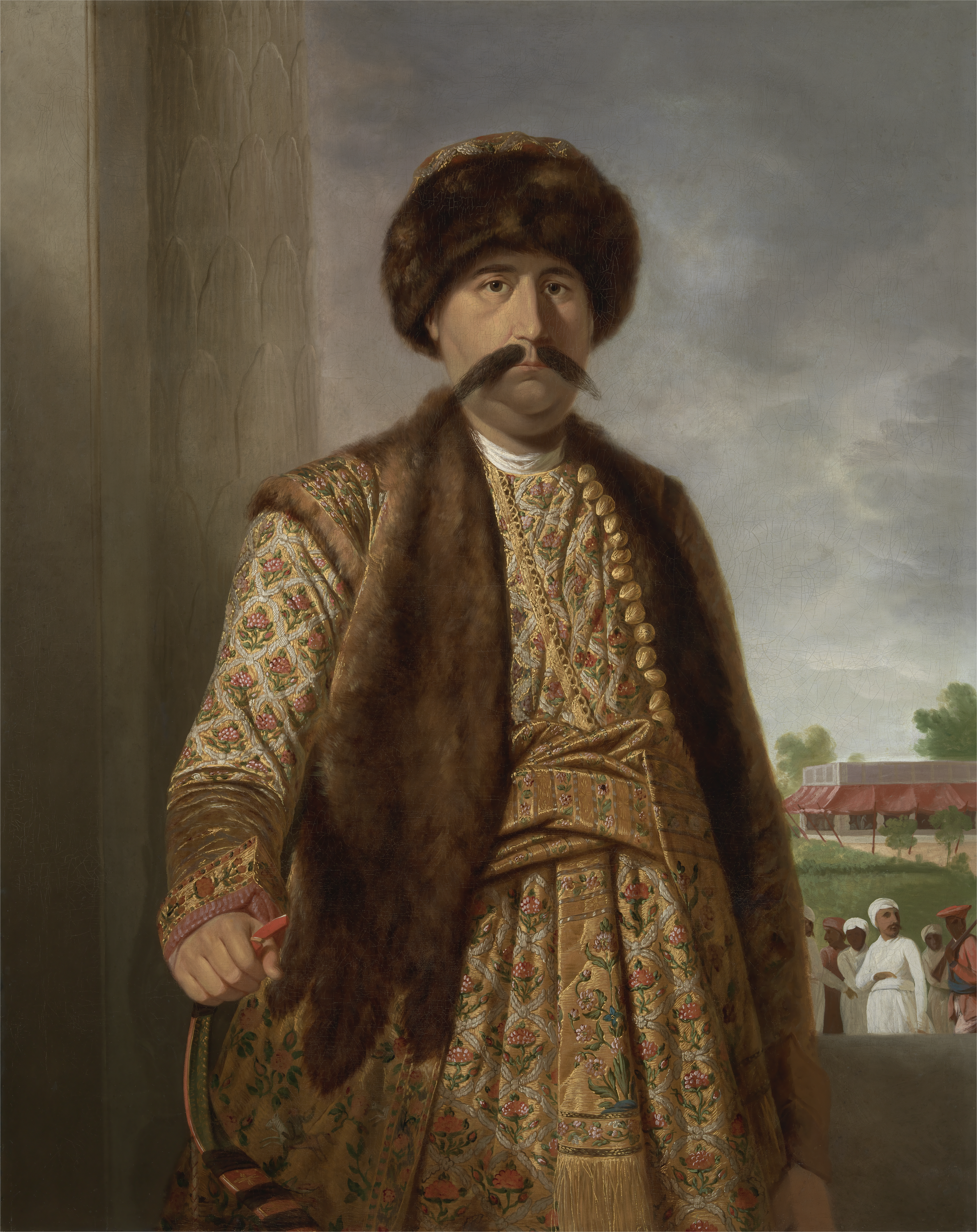
Shuja-ud-Daula died 26 January

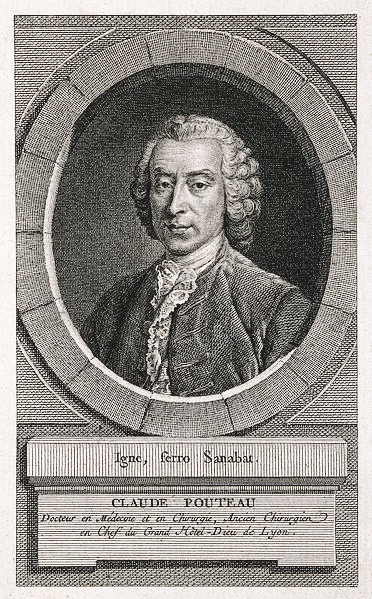
Claude Pouteau died 10 February

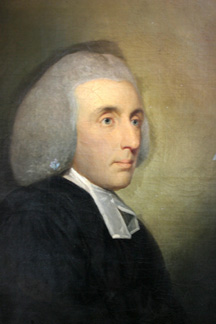
William Small died 25 February

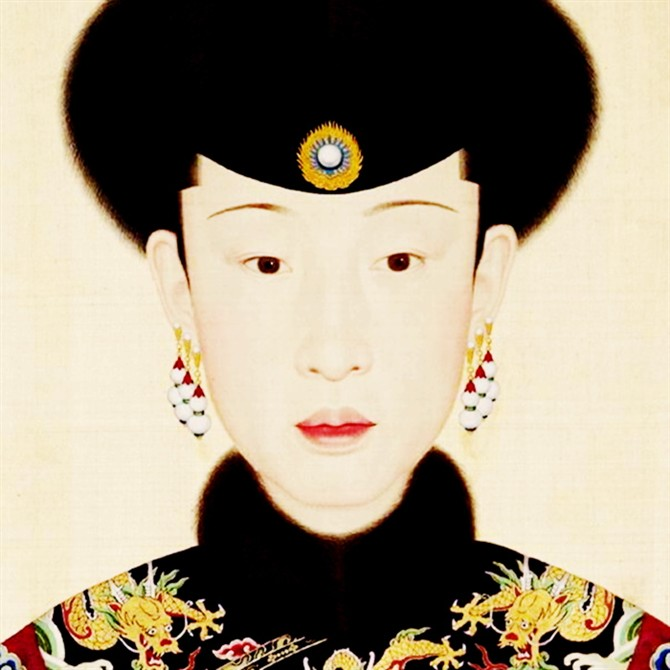
Empress Xiaoyichun died 28 February

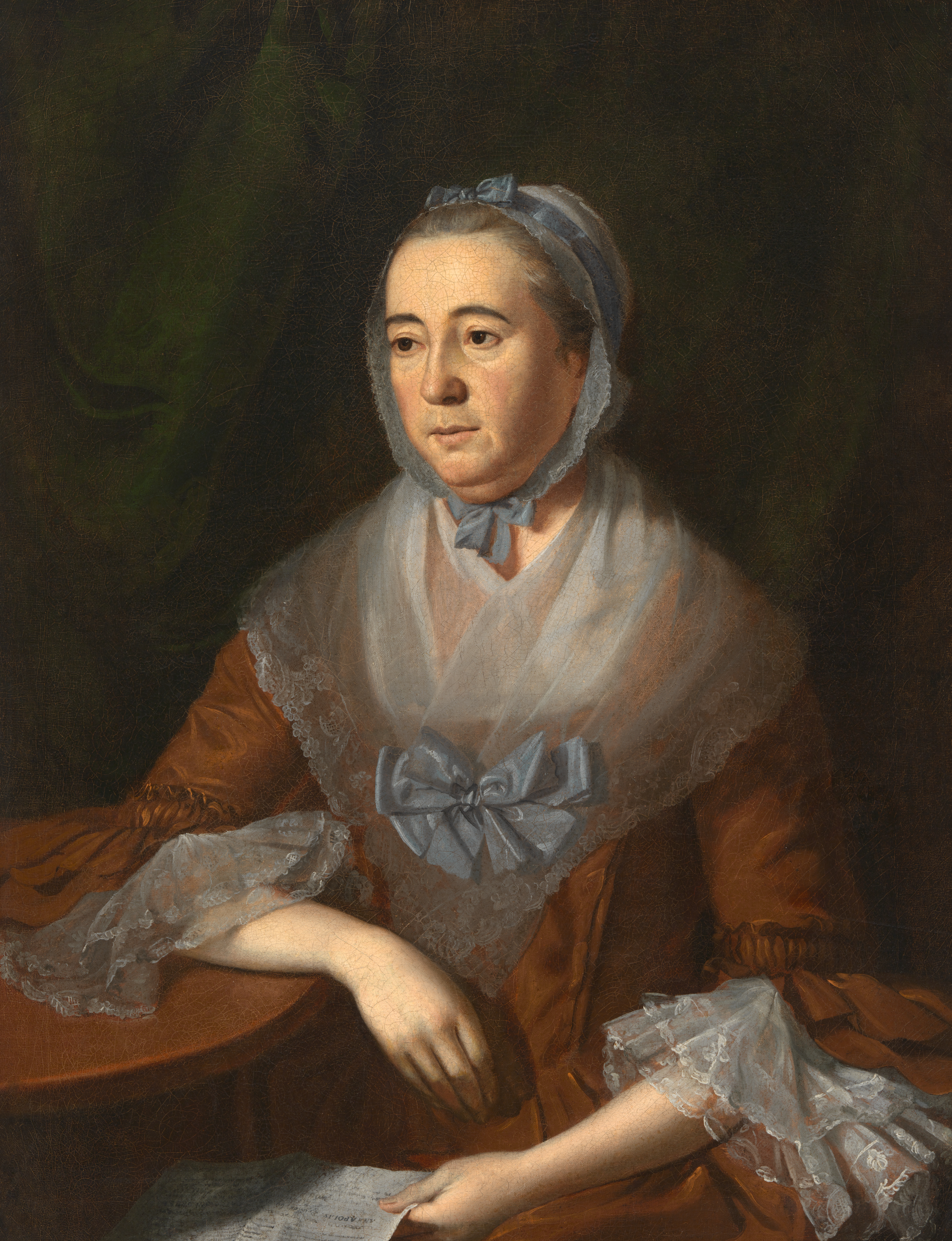
Anne Catherine Hoof Green died 23 March

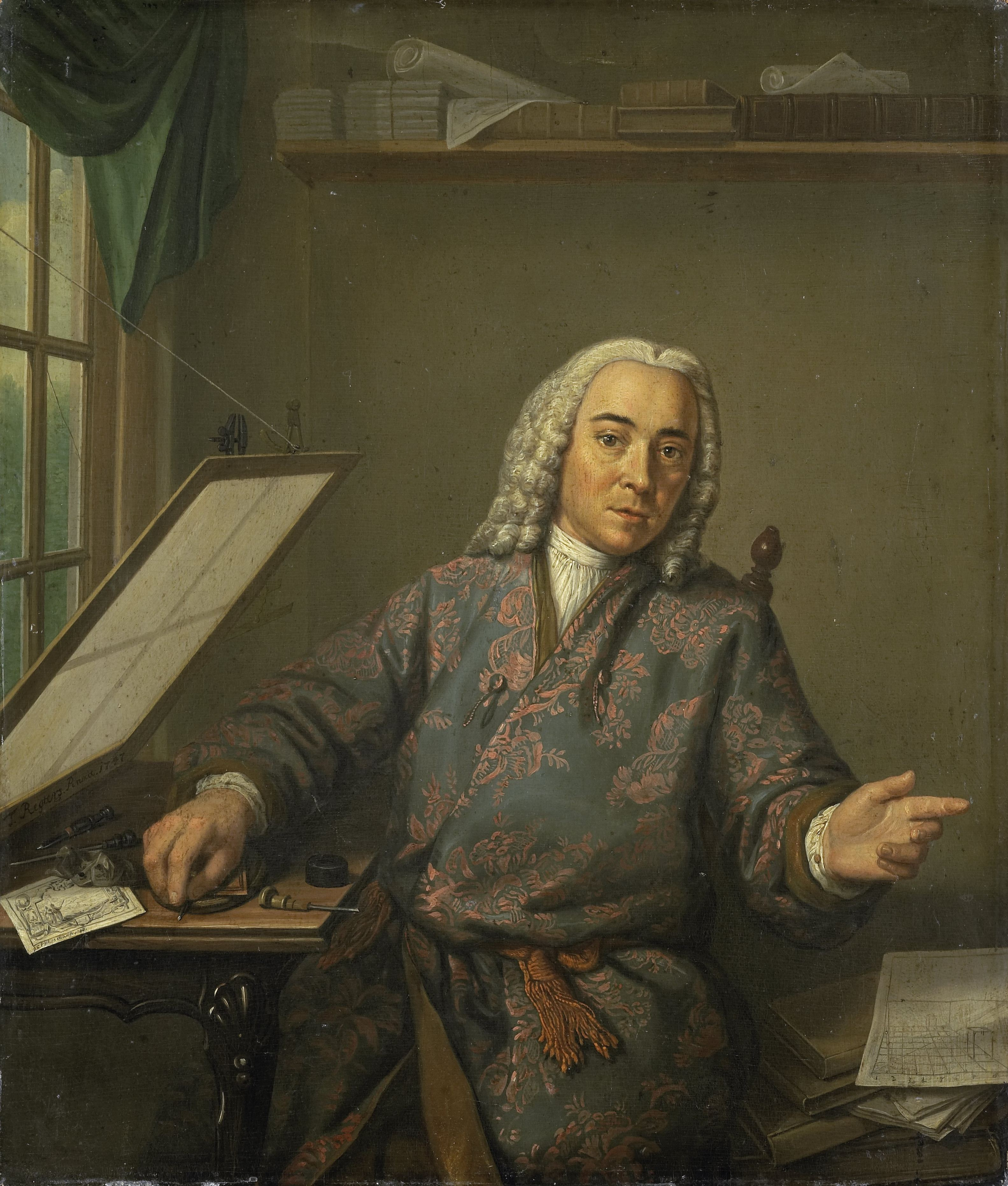
Jan Caspar Philips died 24 April

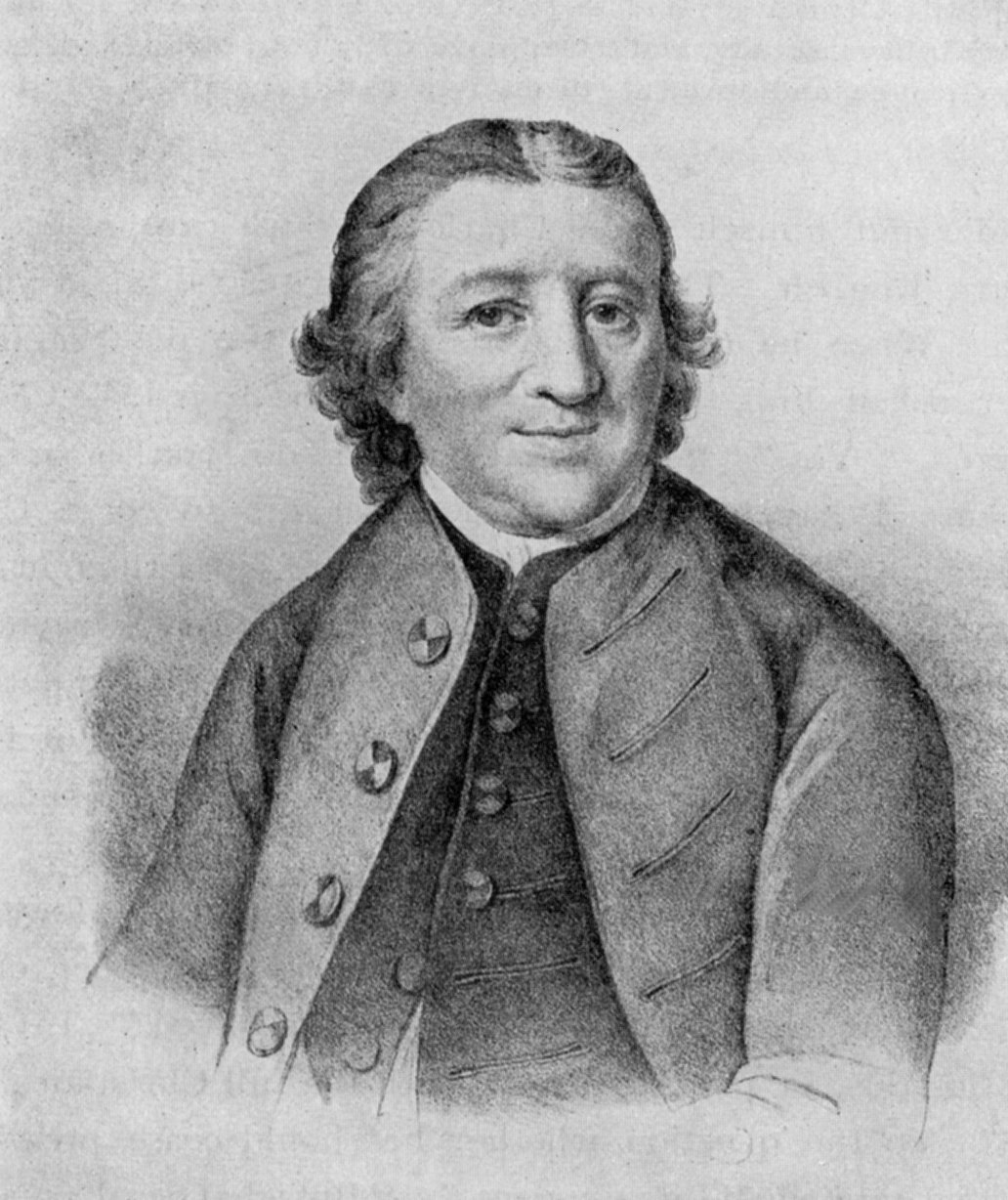
Peter Boehler died 27 April

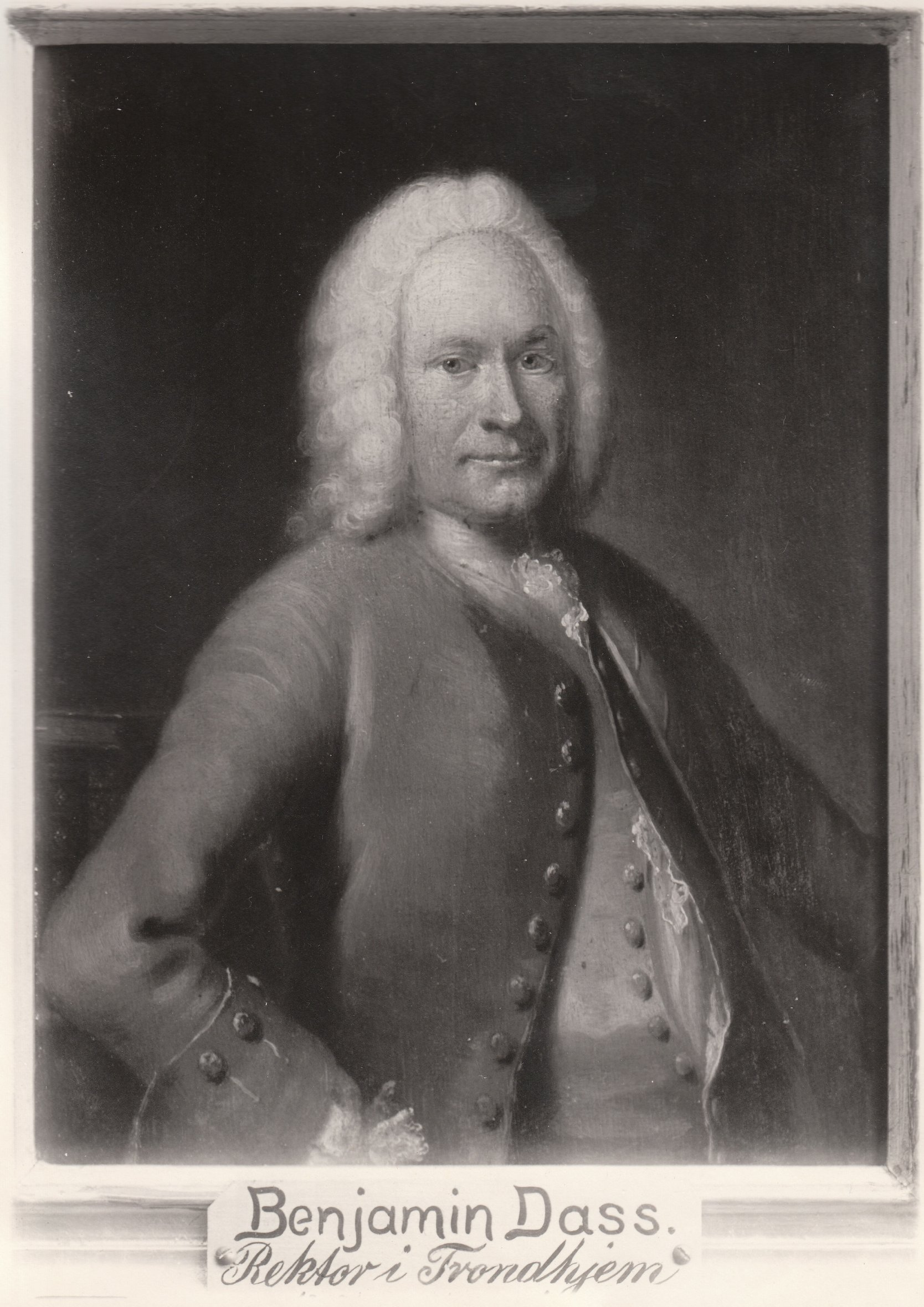
Benjamin Dass died 5 May

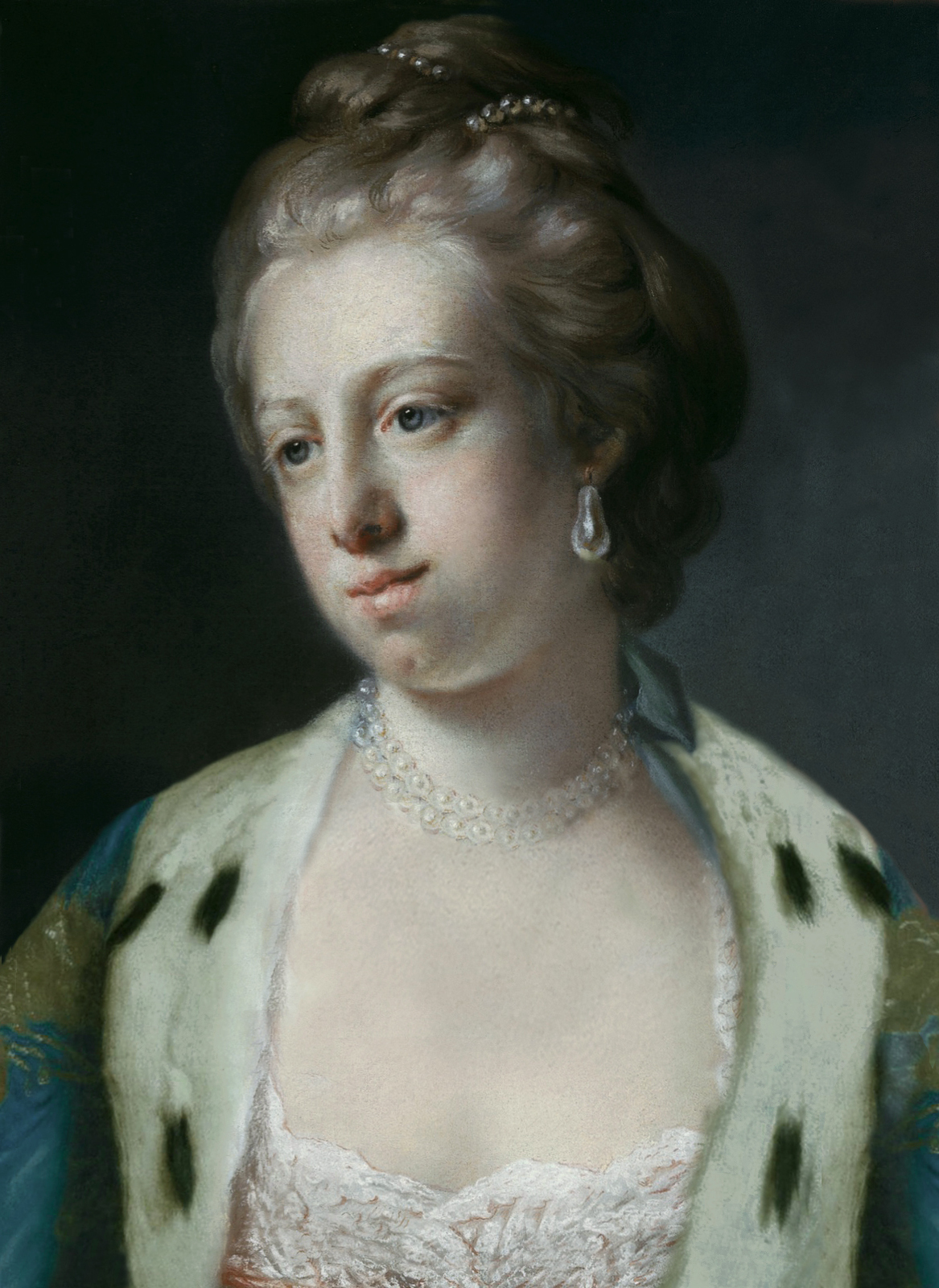
Caroline Matilda of Great Britain died 10 May

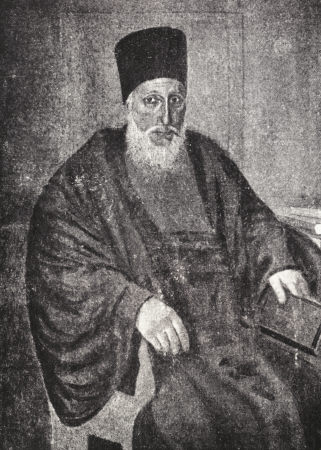
Samuel of Constantinople died 10 May

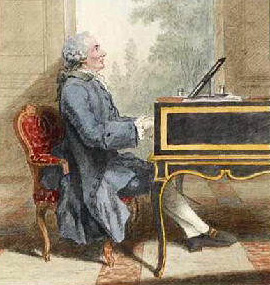
Egidio Duni died 11 June

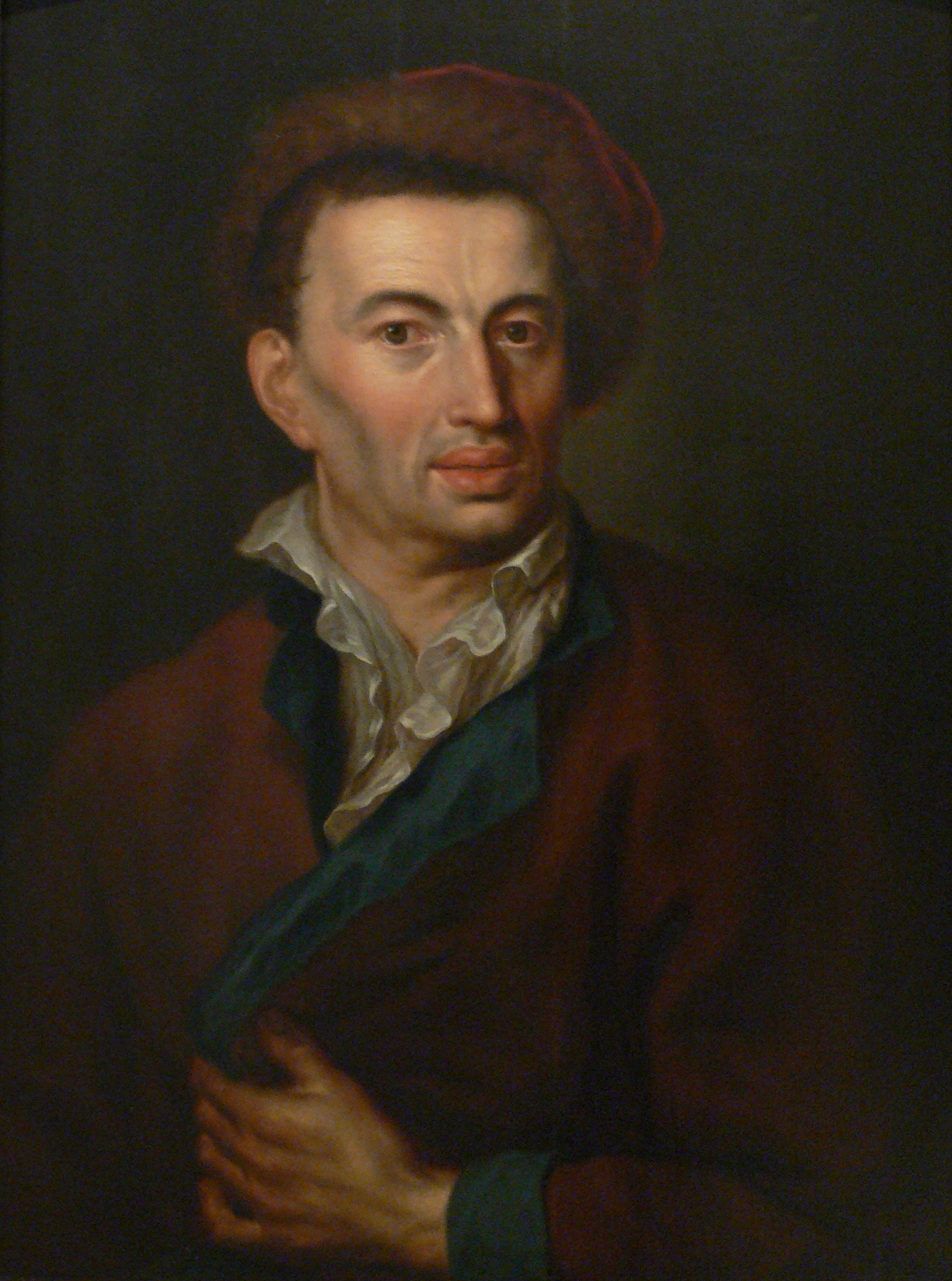
Ignaz Günther died 27 June

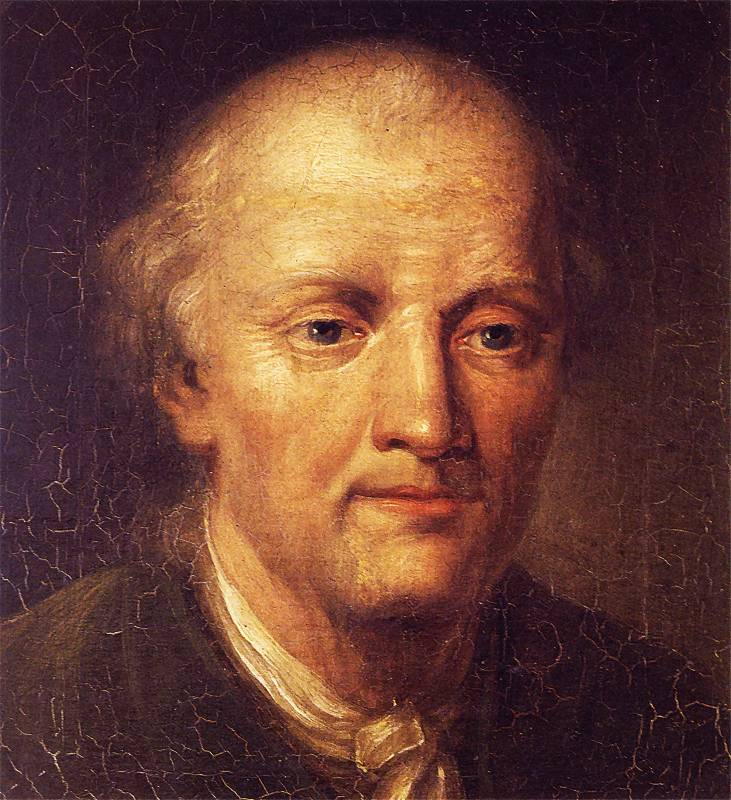
Szymon Czechowicz died 21 July

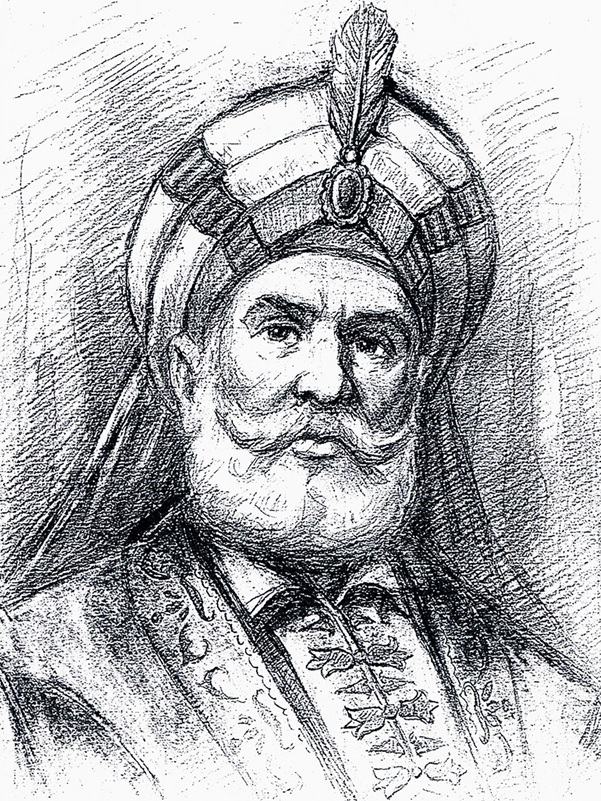
Zahir al-Umar died 21 August

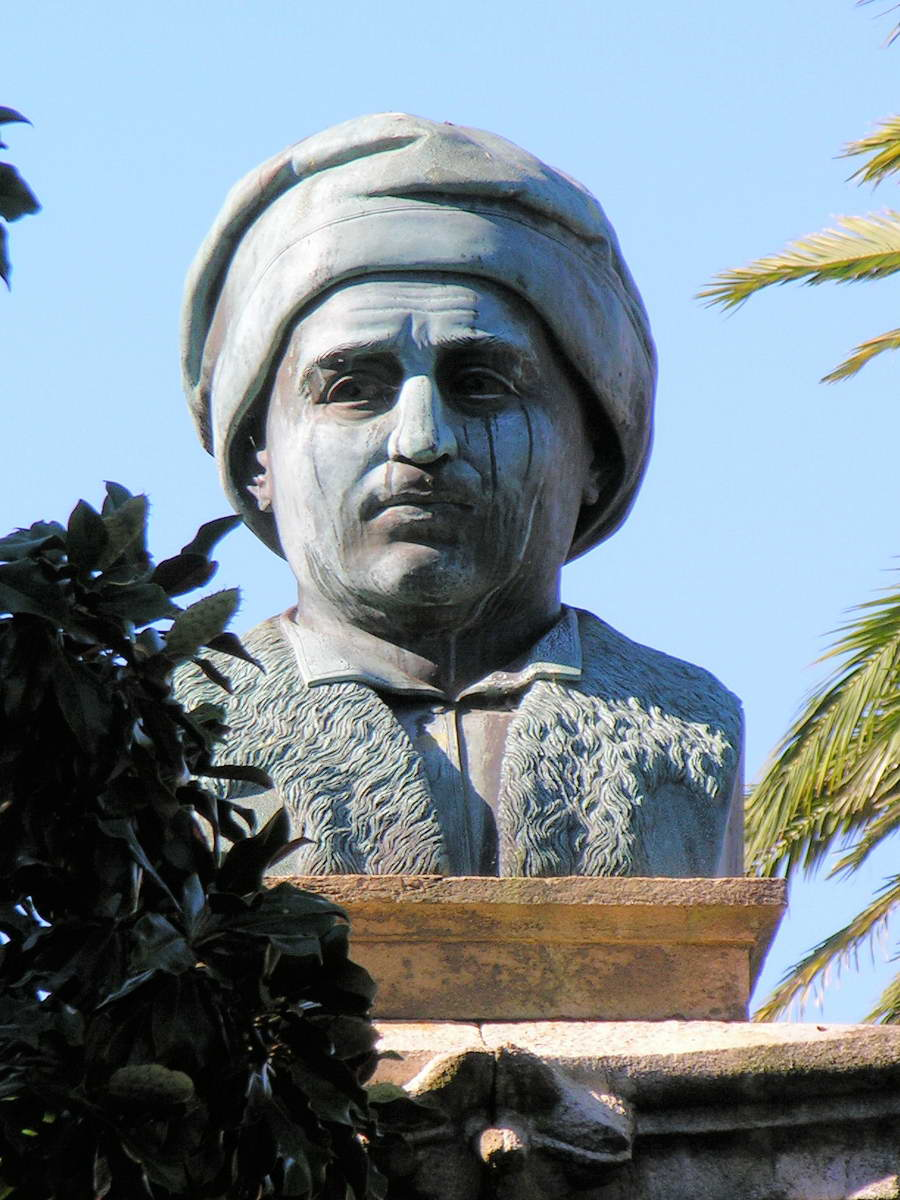
Felipe de Castro died 25 August

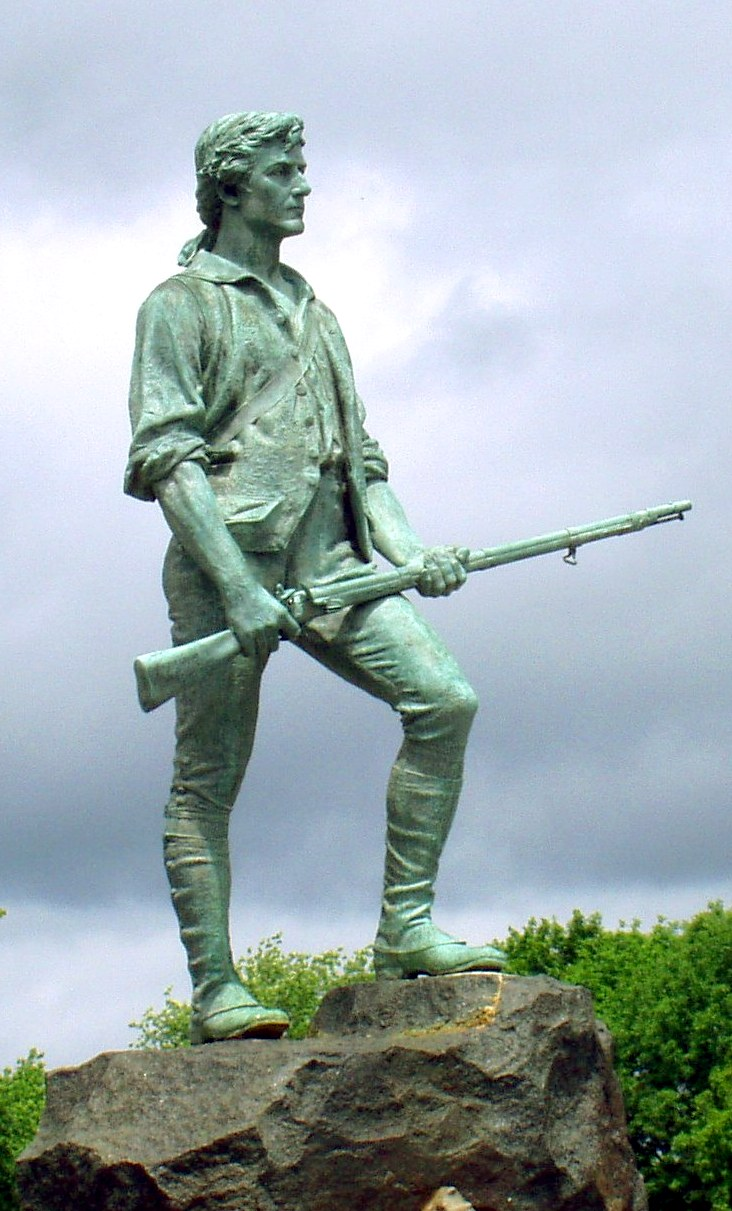
John Parker (captain) died 17 September

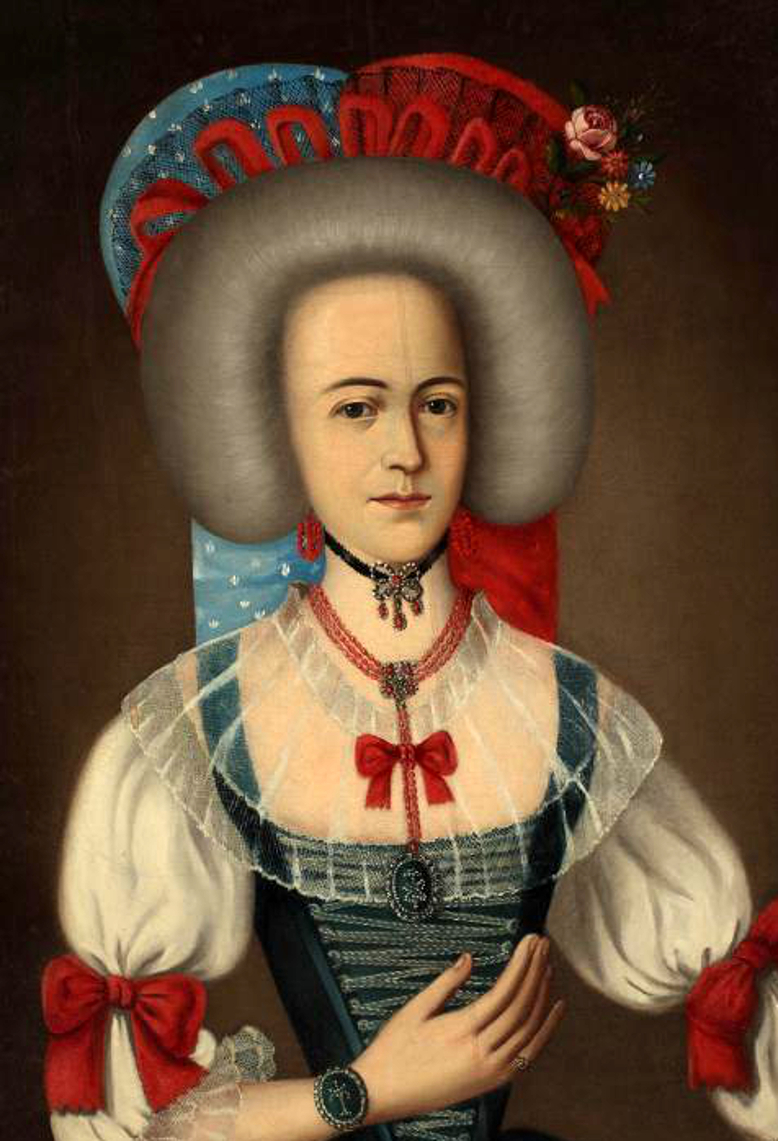
Polixénia Daniel died 24 September

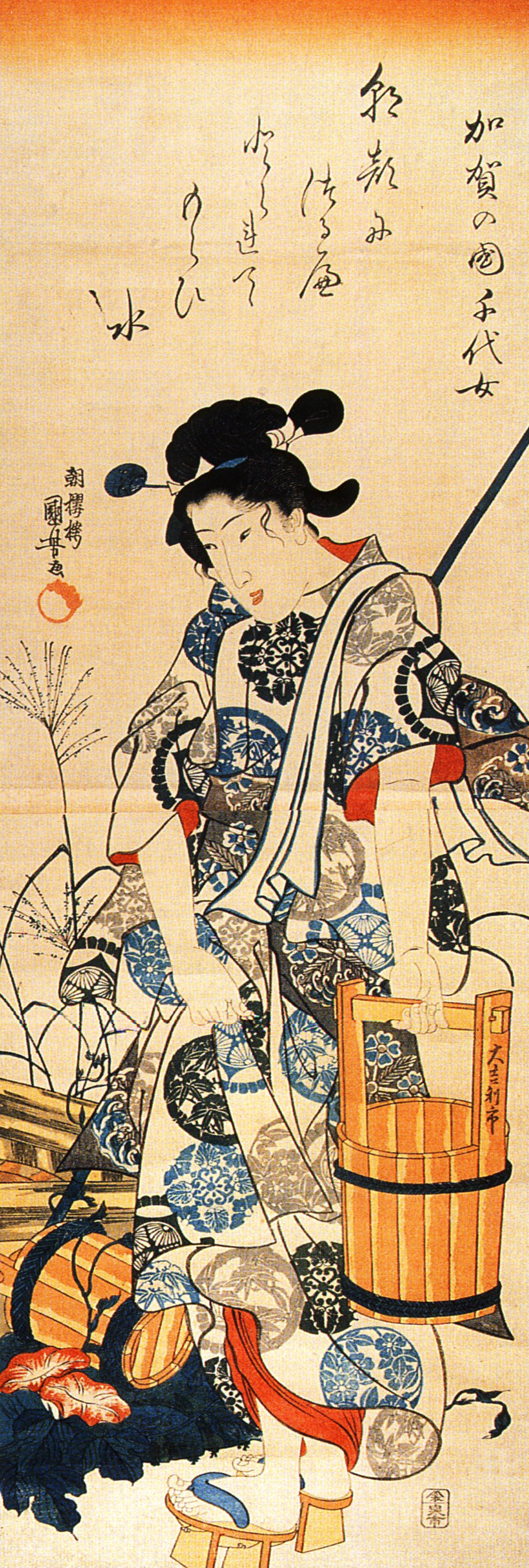
Fukuda Chiyo-ni died 2 October

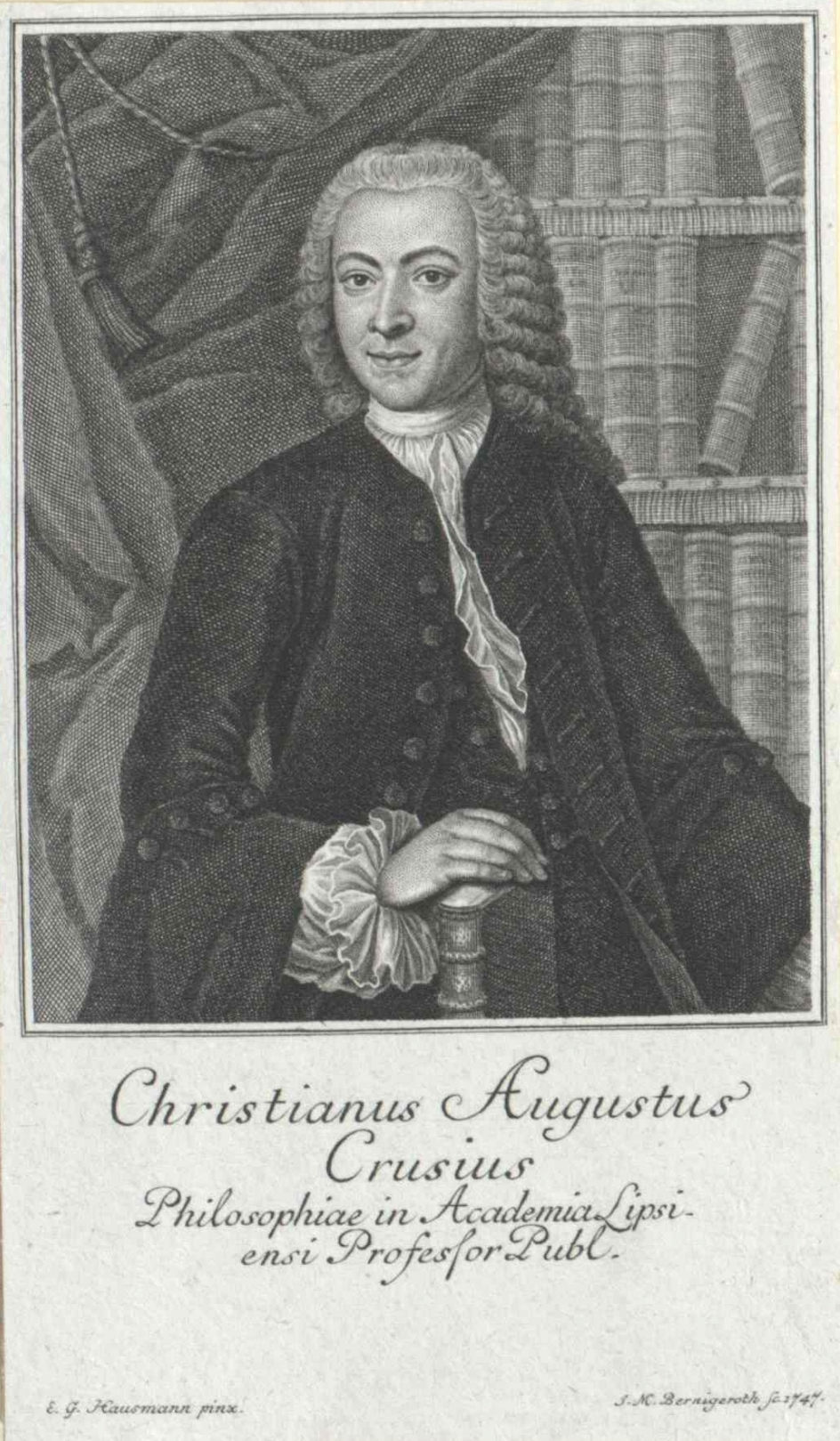
Christian August Crusius died 18 October

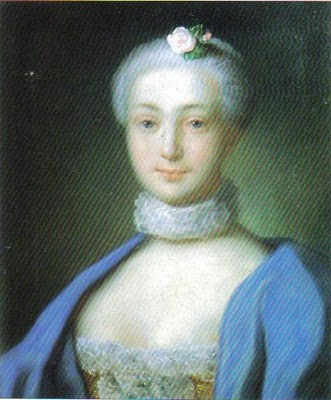
Maria Wilhelmina von Neipperg died 21 October

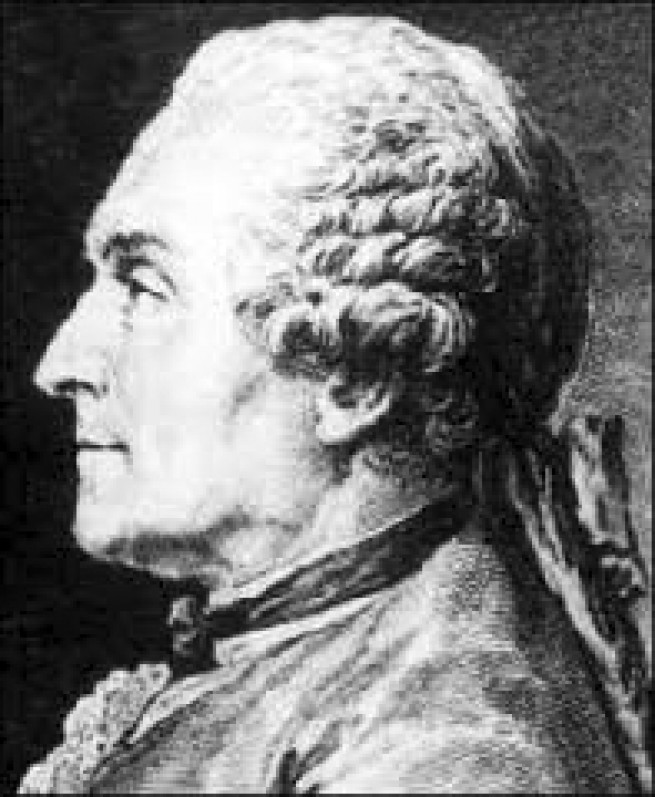
Gabriel François Venel died 29 October

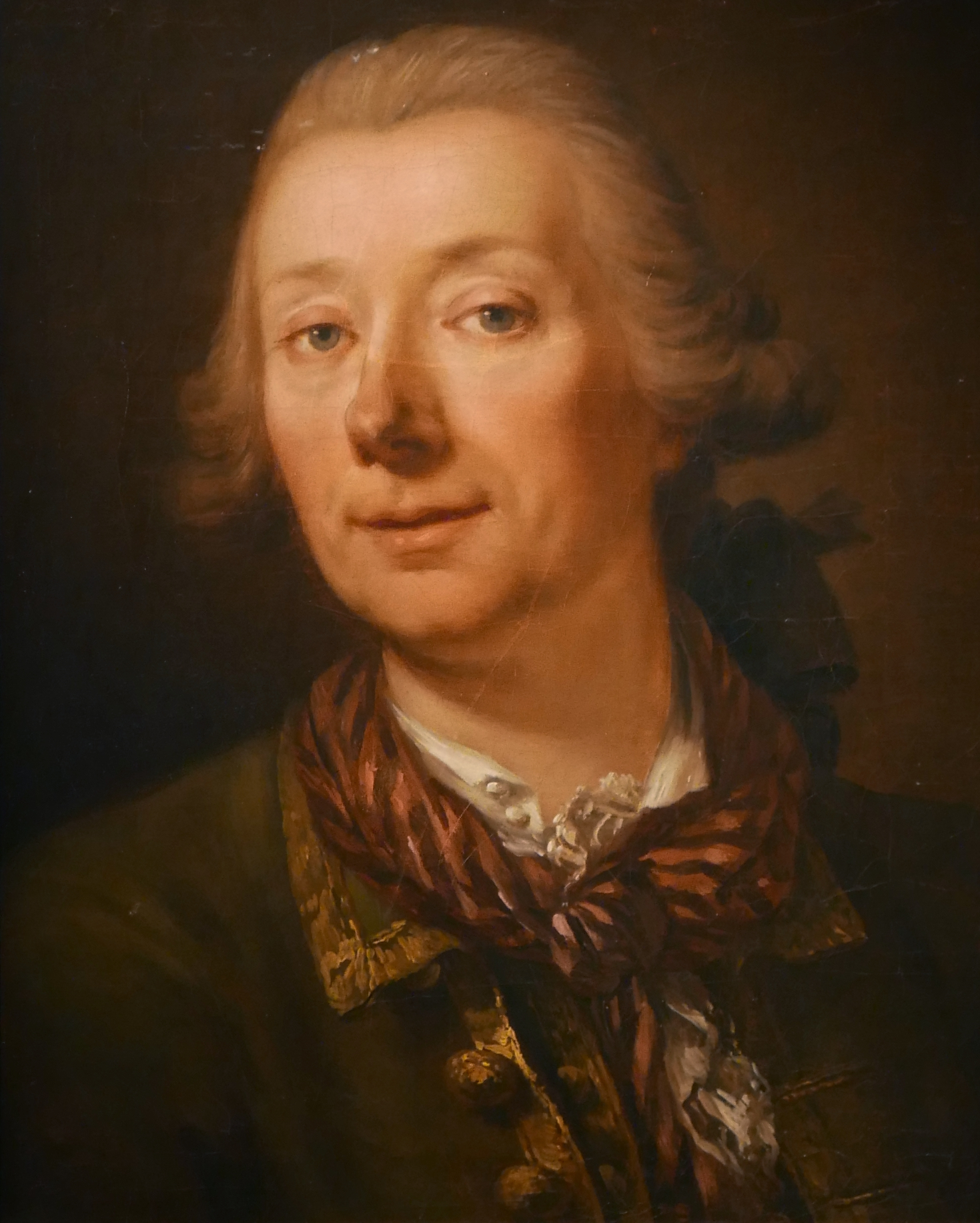
Guillaume de Barrême de Châteaufort died 6 November

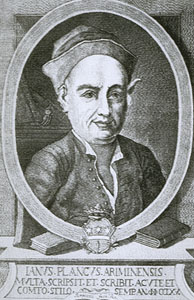
Giovanni Bianchi (physician) died 3 December

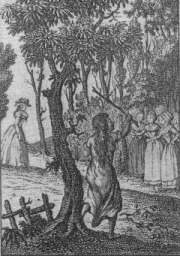
Marie-Angélique Memmie Le Blanc died 15 December

=== January ===
- January 1 – Ahmad Shah Bahadur, 13th Mughal Emperor (b. 1725)
- January 2
  - St George St George, 1st Baron St George, Irish politician (b. 1710)
  - William Napier, 7th Lord Napier, British noble (b. 1730)
- January 3
  - Henry Beekman, New York landowner and provincial assemblyman (b. 1687)
  - Robert Campbell, Nova Scotia politician (b. 1718)
- January 6 – Khawaja Muhammad Zaman of Luari, Sindhi Sufi poet (b. 1713)
- January 8 – John Baskerville, British printer (b. 1706)
- January 10
  - Stringer Lawrence, Early British military leader in India (b. 1697)
  - Yemelyan Pugachev, leader of a Russian peasant uprising (b. 1742)
- January 11
  - Indra Kumari Devi, Queen consort of Nepal (b. 1724)
  - Queen Narendra of Nepal, Queen consort of Gorkha (b. 1723)
  - Prithvi Narayan Shah, last ruler of the Gorkha Kingdom in the Indian subcontinent (b. 1723)
- January 13 – Johann Georg Walch, German theologian (b. 1693)
- January 14 – Peter Schenk the Younger, Dutch engraver and map publisher in Leipzig (b. 1693)
- January 15 – Giovanni Battista Sammartini, Italian composer (b. 1700)
- January 17 – Vincenzo Riccati, Venetian mathematician and physicist (b. 1707)
- January 20
  - Sebastian Klotz, German violin maker (b. 1696)
  - Sir George Oxenden, 5th Baronet, English politician (b. 1694)
- January 21 – Isaac de Forcade de Biaix, Prussian colonel (b. 1704)
- January 25
  - Bernardo de Rossi, Italian theologian (b. 1687)
  - Georg Friedrich Schmidt, German artist (b. 1712)
- January 26
  - Domingo de Bonechea, Spanish explorer (b. 1713)
  - Johann Gregor Herold, German painter (b. 1696)
  - Shuja-ud-Daula, Subedar Nawab of Oudh, India (b. 1732)
- January 29 – Henry Willoughby, 16th Baron Willoughby of Parham, Peer in House of Lords (b. 1696)

=== February ===
- February 1 – Nicholas Herbert, British Member of Parliament (b. 1706)
- February 2 – Sir John Rushout, 4th Baronet, British politician (b. 1685)
- February 4 – John Ryder, Irish Anglican bishop (b. 1697)
- February 5 – Eusebius Amort, German Roman Catholic theologian (b. 1692)
- February 6 – William Dowdeswell, British politician (b. 1721)
- February 7 – Mary Butterworth, British counterfeiter in colonial America (b. 1686)
- February 9 – Princess Hejing, manchu princess of the Qing Dynasty (b. 1756)
- February 10 – Claude Pouteau, French surgeon and inventor (b. 1724)
- February 15
  - Peter Dens, Belgian Catholic theologian (b. 1690)
  - Diego Fernández, harpsichord maker of the Spanish court (b. 1703)
- February 16 – Jean-Baptiste Vivien de Châteaubrun, French dramatist and playwright (b. 1686)
- February 24 – Ferdinando Colonna of Stigliano, 2nd Prince of Sonnino (b. 1695)
- February 25 – William Small, Scottish medical doctor and professor of natural philosophy (b. 1734)
- February 28
  - Paul Cardale, British minister (b. 1705)
  - Margaret Coke, Countess of Leicester, British peeress (b. 1700)
  - Empress Xiaoyichun, Qing Dynasty empress (b. 1727)

=== March ===
- March 2 – Nikolaos Doxaras, Greek artist (b. 1710)
- March 3 – Richard Dunthorne, British astronomer (b. 1711)
- March 5 – Pierre-Laurent Buirette de Belloy, French actor and dramatist (b. 1727)
- March 6
  - Job Baster, Dutch naturalist (b. 1711)
  - Gaudenzio Botti, Italian painter (b. 1698)
- March 7
  - John Boyle, 3rd Earl of Glasgow, British Earl (b. 1714)
  - Thomas Nuthall, English lawyer and politician (b. 1720)
- March 20 – Pedro Antonio Barroeta y Ángel, Spanish Catholic priest, Archbishop of Lima, Archbishop of Granada (b. 1701)
- March 21 – Thomas Penn, son of William Penn, founder of the Province of Pennsylvania (b. 1702)
- March 22
  - Peter August, Duke of Schleswig-Holstein-Sonderburg-Beck (b. 1697)
  - Hendrik Carré II, Dutch painter (b. 1696)
- March 23 – Anne Catherine Hoof Green, American printer and publisher (b. 1720)
- March 30
  - William Irby, 1st Baron Boston, British peer (b. 1707)
  - Christian Ditlev Reventlow, Danish Privy Councillor (b. 1710)
- March 31 – Samuel Heathcote, British Member of Parliament (b. 1699)

=== April ===
- April 4 – René Charles de Maupeou, French statesman (b. 1688)
- April 5 – Simon Nikolaus Euseb von Montjoye-Hirsingen, Prince Bishop of Basel (b. 1693)
- April 7 – Sir Anthony Abdy, 5th Baronet, 5th Abdy Baronet (b. 1720)
- April 10
  - Jonas Haas, German-born Danish engraver (b. 1720)
  - Louis-Florent de Vallière, Governor General of the French colony of Saint-Domingue, now Haiti (b. 1721)
- April 11
  - Meletie Covaci, Roman Catholic bishop (b. 1707)
  - Roger Mostyn, English churchman, Canon of Windsor (b. 1720)
- April 12
  - William Kerr, 4th Marquess of Lothian, Scottish nobleman (b. 1710)
  - Pierre Soubeyran, Genevan-French engraver and copperplate engraver (b. 1709)
  - William Vaughan, Welsh politician (b. 1707)
- April 14 – Countess Palatine Ernestine of Sulzbach, Landgravine and Carmelite nun (b. 1697)
- April 16 – William Leyborne Leyborne, governor of the Windward Islands (b. 1744)
- April 19 – Isaac Davis, American gunsmith and militia officer (b. 1745)
- April 24 – Jan Caspar Philips, engraver from the Northern Netherlands (b. 1690)
- April 26 – Josiah Quincy II, American lawyer (b. 1744)
- April 27 – Peter Boehler, Moravian missionary (b. 1712)
- April 30
  - Francesco Barsanti, Italian flautist, oboist and composer (b. 1690)
  - Peter Harrison, English-born colonial American architect (b. 1716)

=== May ===
- May 1 – Israel Lyons, English mathematician and botanist (b. 1739)
- May 2
  - Mary Montagu, Duchess of Montagu, wife of George Brudenell Montagu, Duke of Montagu (b. 1711)
  - Fredericka of Saxe-Gotha-Altenburg, duchess consort of Saxe-Weissenfels (b. 1715)
- May 3 – George Boscawen, British Army general (b. 1712)
- May 5
  - John Blennerhassett, Anglo-Irish politician (b. 1691)
  - Benjamin Dass, Norwegian teacher and book collector (b. 1706)
- May 7 – Cornelius Heinrich Dretzel, German organist and composer (b. 1697)
- May 9
  - Domingo de Basavilbaso, Argentinian businessperson (b. 1709)
  - Vittoria Tesi, Italian opera singer and music teacher (b. 1701)
- May 10
  - Marie Magdalene Charlotte Ackermann, German actress (b. 1757)
  - Caroline Matilda of Great Britain, Queen consort of Denmark and Norway, 1766–1772 (b. 1751)
  - Samuel of Constantinople, Ecumenical Patriarch of Constantinople (b. 1700)
- May 15
  - Hans-Friedrich von Krusemark, Lieutenant General in the Prussian Army of Frederick the Great (b. 1720)
  - Johann Daniel Ritter, German historian (b. 1709)
- May 16 – Ulla von Liewen, Swedish courtier and baroness (b. 1747)
- May 17 – Carlo Carlone, painter (b. 1686)
- May 18
  - Magnus Beronius, Archbishop of Uppsala in the Church of Sweden (b. 1692)
  - Johann Joachim Kändler, German artist (b. 1706)
- May 25 – Karl Gottlieb Guichard, German writer (b. 1724)
- May 27 – Louise Élisabeth de Bourbon, French noblewoman (b. 1693)
- May 28 – Barlow Trecothick, English merchant and politician (b. 1719)
- May 30 – Jean Capperonnier, French classical scholar (b. 1716)

=== June ===
- June 5 – Giovanni Gaetano Bottari, Italian scholar and critic (b. 1689)
- June 6 – Sir Charles Burton, 1st Baronet, Anglo-Irish politician (b. 1702)
- June 11 – Egidio Duni, Italian composer (b. 1708)
- June 15 – Asa Pollard, American soldier (b. 1735)
- June 17
  - Andrew McClary, soldier and major in the Continental Army during the American Revolution (b. 1730)
  - John Pitcairn, British Marine officer during the American Revolutionary War (b. 1722)
  - Joseph Warren, American doctor (b. 1741)
- June 19 – Andrew Barclay, Scottish-American merchant (b. 1719)
- June 21 – Charles, Prince of Nassau-Usingen and Nassau-Saarbrücken (b. 1712)
- June 23
  - James Abercrombie, British army officer, died during the American Revolutionary War (b. 1732)
  - Karl Ludwig von Pöllnitz, German soldier, adventurer and writer (b. 1692)
- June 26 – Aryeh Leib Epstein, Polish rabbi (b. 1708)
- June 27
  - Ignaz Günther, German sculptor and woodcarver (b. 1725)
  - Robert Livingston, member of New York colonial assembly (b. 1688)
- June 29 – Anna Smitshuizen, Dutch prostitute, victim of a cause célèbre murder (b. 1751)
- June 30 – Charles Maynard, 1st Viscount Maynard, British noble (b. 1690)

=== July ===
- July 3 – Thomas Gardner, American politician and colonel (b. 1724)
- July 11 – Simon Boerum, American Continental Congressman (b. 1724)
- July 13
  - Louis Charles, Count of Eu, member of the French Capetian dynasty (b. 1701)
  - John Ratcliffe, English academic, Master of Pembroke College, Oxford (b. 1700)
- July 15 – Servais Duriau, Belgian Cistercian monk (b. 1701)
- July 18 – Joseph Knight, senior Royal Navy officer, served as East Indies Station (b. c. 1708)
- July 20 – Enrico Albrici, Italian painter (b. 1714)
- July 21
  - Robert Bolling, American politician (b. 1738)
  - Szymon Czechowicz, prominent Polish Baroque painter (b. 1689)
- July 22 – Thomas Lockhart, politician (b. 1739)
- July 24 – John Pollen, British Member of Parliament (b. 1702)

=== August ===
- August 4 – Sir Gregory Page, 2nd Baronet, English art collector and landowner (b. 1689)
- August 5 – Maharaja Nandakumar, tax official (b. 1705)
- August 9 – Johann Ernst Gotzkowsky, Prussian merchant, art dealer and diplomat (b. 1710)
- August 10
  - Elihu Adams, soldier in the Continental Army during the American Revolutionary War (b. 1741)
  - César de Missy, Prussian book collector and theologian (b. 1703)
- August 12 – Remember Baker, American soldier, member of the Green Mountain Boys (murdered) (b. 1737)
- August 13 – Michał Fryderyk Czartoryski, Polish nobleman (b. 1696)
- August 14 – Laurens Storm van 's Gravesande, Dutch governor of the colonies of Essequibo and Demerara (b. 1704)
- August 16 – Jakob Langebek, Danish historian (b. 1710)
- August 21 – Zahir al-Umar, Arab ruler of northern Palestine (b. 1689)
- August 25 – Felipe de Castro, Spanish sculptor (b. 1711)
- August 27 – James Burgh, British Whig politician and writer (b. 1714)
- August 28 – James Habersham, Merchant and politician in the British colony of Georgia (b. 1712)
- August 29 – Francesco Sleter, Italian painter (b. 1685)
- August 30 – George Faulkner, Irish publisher and bookseller (b. 1699)

=== September ===
- September 2 – Antoine Touron, French historian (b. 1686)
- September 4 – Al-Mahdi Abbas, Imam of Yemen (b. 1719)
- September 6 – Jean-Baptiste Bullet, French writer (b. 1699)
- September 8 – John Conyers, English politician (b. 1717)
- September 12 – Charles-Louis Mion, French composer (b. 1699)
- September 13
  - Klaas Annink, Dutch serial killer (executed) (b. 1710)
  - Guillaume Mazeas, French physicist (b. 1720)
  - Constantine Phipps, 1st Baron Mulgrave, Irish Baron (b. 1722)
- September 14 – Janusz Aleksander Sanguszko, Court Marshal of Lithuania (b. 1712)
- September 16 – Allen Bathurst, 1st Earl Bathurst, English privy councillor (b. 1684)
- September 17
  - Charles Allanson, British Member of Parliament (b. 1720)
  - John Parker, American colonial farmer, smith and soldier (b. 1729)
- September 21 – Abel Prescott Jr., American Patriot (b. 1749)
- September 23 – John Bentinck, British naval officer, inventor and MP (b. 1737)
- September 24
  - Emanuel Büchel, Swiss graphic artist, aquarellist, topographer and baker (b. 1705)
  - Polixénia Daniel, Hungarian noble and writer (b. 1720)
- September 28 – Ukawsaw Gronniosaw, writer and enslaved man (b. 1710)

=== October ===
- October 2 – Fukuda Chiyo-ni, Japanese haiku poet and Buddhist nun (b. 1703)
- October 3 – Cluer Dicey, English newspaper proprietor and patent medicine vendor (b. 1715)
- October 5 – Amos Adams, Anglican clergy (b. 1728)
- October 10 – Louis Nicolas Victor de Félix d'Ollières, Marshal of France (b. 1711)
- October 13 – James Cholmondeley, British Army officer, Member of Parliament (b. 1708)
- October 14 – Gilles Joubert, French master cabinetmaker (b. 1689)
- October 16
  - Peter van Hurk, Danish merchant (b. 1697)
  - Antti Piimänen, Finnish churchbuilder (b. 1712)
- October 18
  - Michael Cresap, Continental Army officer (b. 1742)
  - Paul of the Cross, Italian mystic (b. 1694)
  - Christian August Crusius, German philosopher and theologian (b. 1715)
- October 20 – Sir John Molesworth, 5th Baronet, British Member of Parliament (b. 1729)
- October 21
  - François-Hubert Drouais, French painter (b. 1727)
  - Maria Wilhelmina von Neipperg, Mistress of Austrian royalty (b. 1738)
  - Sakai Tadamochi, 酒井忠用 Daimyo (b. 1723)
- October 22 – Peyton Randolph, planter and public official from the Colony of Virginia (b. 1721)
- October 27 – Johan Maurits Mohr, Dutch-German pastor and astronomer (b. 1716)
- October 29 – Gabriel François Venel, French chemist (b. 1723)

=== November ===
- November 1 – Pierre-Joseph Bernard, French writer (b. 1708)
- November 2 – Noble Jones, British American politician (b. 1702)
- November 3 – Juan José Pérez Hernández, Spanish explorer (b. 1725)
- November 5
  - Tysoe Hancock, English medical doctor (b. 1723)
  - Christian IV, Count Palatine of Zweibrücken, German noble (b. 1722)
  - Luis Jayme, Spanish-born Franciscan (b. 1740)
- November 6
  - Peter Burrell, British politician (b. 1724)
  - Guillaume de Barrême de Châteaufort, French painter (b. 1719)
- November 7
  - Johann Gottfried Hildebrandt, organ builder (b. 1724)
  - François Rebel, French composer (b. 1701)
- November 9 – Francisco Ximénez de Tejada, Spanish knight, 69th Grandmaster of the Knights Hospitaller (b. 1703)
- November 12 – John Smith, English politician (b. 1727)
- November 13 – Jeanne Camus de Pontcarré, French aristocrat and eccentric widow (b. 1705)
- November 21 – John Hill, English author and botanist (b. 1716)
- November 22 – Claude-Henri de Fusée de Voisenon, French dramatist and writer (b. 1708)
- November 24 – Lorenzo Ricci, Superior General of the Society of Jesus (b. 1703)
- November 25
  - Jacob Benzon, Norwegian judge (b. 1688)
  - Richard Spry, British Royal Navy officer, North America and West Indies Station (b. 1715)
- November 28 – Thomas Elfe, British cabinet-maker (b. 1719)
- November 29 – Juan Curiel, Spanish intellectual and politician (b. 1690)

=== December ===
- December 3 – Giovanni Bianchi, Italian medical doctor and zoologist (b. 1693)
- December 7
  - Charles Saunders, British politician (b. 1715)
  - Fabrizio Serbelloni, Catholic cardinal (b. 1695)
- December 8 – Josef Ignaz Mildorfer, Austrian painter (b. 1719)
- December 9
  - Pietro Gnocchi, Italian composer (b. 1689)
  - Robert Livingston, landowner and politician in Colonial America (b. 1718)
- December 15
  - Marie-Angélique Memmie Le Blanc, French feral child (b. 1712)
  - Princess Tarakanova, Pretender to the Russian throne (b. 1753)
- December 16 – Gustavus Hamilton, Irish painter (b. 1739)
- December 20 – Sigismund Streit, German art collector (b. 1687)
- December 21 – Theresa Parker, English art patron (b. 1745)
- December 28
  - John Campbell, Scottish author (b. 1708)
  - Petrus Albertus van der Parra, Dutch colonial governor (b. 1714)
  - John Phillips, English master carpenter and architect (b. 1709)
- December 31
  - Richard Montgomery, American general (killed in battle) (b. 1738)
  - Anna Vorontsova, Russian lady-in-waiting (b. 1722)
- Date unknown – Sarah Buttall, English silversmith
