= Žofia Kubini =

Hungarian poet

Žofia Kubini was a 17th-century poet in the Kingdom of Hungary. Her name also appears as Žsofia Kubinyi and Žofia Kubiniová.

She was born into an aristocratic Protestant family in Vlachy in Liptov (now part of Slovakia) in the early or middle 17th century. She was a cousin of the poet Kata Szidónia Petrőczy. Kubini married Peter Szmrecsany. She died in Smrečany.

Her only poem which has been preserved is Ženíchu můj spanilý (O, comely bridegroom), a religious hymn which first appeared in the Lutheran hymn book in 1741. The hymn became popular for use in wedding ceremonies. Kubini wrote in an older form of the Czech language.
