= Martin (bishop of Eger) =

14th-century Hungarian Catholic bishop

- Bishop of Eger
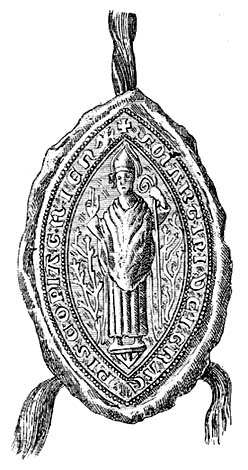
- Seal of Martin, 1307
- See: Eger
- Appointed: 1306
- Term ended: 1322
- Predecessor: Andrew
- Successor: Csanád Telegdi

Personal details
- Died: 1322

Martin (Hungarian: Márton; died 1322) was a Hungarian prelate in the early 14th century, who served as Bishop of Eger from 1306 until his death.

== Pro-royal activity ==
His origin and early ecclesiastical career is unknown. It is possible he is identical with that Martin, who served as archdeacon of Pata prior to that. According to historian Pál Engel, Martin was elected as Bishop of Eger in 1306, succeeding Andrew, who held the dignity for three decades and died in the previous year. Martin had to pay 800 golden florins as servitium commune to the papal court, this relatively low amount reflects the insignificance of the diocese within the Hungarian church hierarchy.

Martin took part in the provincial synod to Udvard, Komárom County (present-day Dvory nad Žitavou, Slovakia), convoked by Archbishop Thomas of Esztergom in May 1307. The attending prelates renewed the excommunication of those barons, clergymen and towns, who did not acknowledge Charles of Anjou as the king of Hungary during the era of Interregnum (1301–1308). Martin also attended the second and third coronations of Charles I in June 1309 and August 1310, respectively.

During the early years of his episcopate, the oligarch Amadeus Aba ruled de facto independently the northern and north-eastern counties of the kingdom, including the overwhelming territory of the Diocese of Eger. Amadeus was considered a strong mainstay of Charles during the war of succession to the Hungarian throne, and Martin maintained a good and cooperative relationship with the oligarch. For instance, Martin and six canons resided in the fort of Gönc, Amadeus' provincial seat in 1307. Unlike in the case of other oligarchs during the era of feudal anarchy, there is no source that Amadeus Aba has materially and in rights harmed the property and institutions of the Church in his province. The political situation changed drastically when Amadeus Aba was killed during a skirmish with the burghers of Kassa (today Košice, Slovakia) in September 1311. The king saw an opportunity to liquidate one of the most extensive oligarchic provinces without hindrance. Charles entrusted Martin and sent his two envoys, Archbishop Thomas of Esztergom and Bishop Stephen Kéki of Veszprém to the province in October 1311, where the three judges arbitrated an agreement between Amadeus' widow and sons and the town, which also prescribed that the Abas withdraw from two counties and allow the noblemen inhabiting their domains to freely join Charles. However, the Aba clan did not accept political downgrading and soon entered into an alliance with Charles' most ardent enemy, Matthew Csák against the king. Alongside other lords and prelates, Martin participated with his banderium in the royal campaign, which consisted of successful sieges and the decisive Battle of Rozgony against the Aba dominion in the summer of 1312. The Diocese of Eger suffered heavy devastation during the war situation since 1311, while violent acts of domination have become commonplace.

== Conflict with the chapter ==
Shortly after his confirmation in 1307, Martin transcribed and confirmed the privilege letter of his predecessor Andrew (1275), in which he returned to the Chapter of Eger the goods previously seized and restored the chapter's right to hold a weekly market on Tuesdays. He also provided the right to freedom of testamentary for the canons in his charter. According to the complaints, the late Andrew continually ignored all these privileges. His predecessor also increased the number of canons to 30, filling new seats with his own supporters, which, however, undermined the livelihood of the canons. Thereafter, Martin determined the number of members of the chapter at 20. Consequently, Martin initially had a good relationship with the Eger Chapter. For instance, in November 1307, the bishop donated landholdings and revenues to the Blessed Virgin monastery of the Minorities in Eger with the consent of the whole chapter. Furthermore, Martin was represented by Peter, Provost of Eger before the Vác Chapter in May 1310.

Following the death of Amadeus Aba, a political vacuum had emerged in the northeastern parts of Hungary. According to historian Csaba Farkas, Martin exploited this situation and began to administrate his diocese without any secular pressure. A sign of this was that the relationship between the bishop and the chapter steadily deteriorated from 1312 to 1315. Martin did not keep his promise and, in overall, did not remedy the excesses of his predecessor. The representatives of the chapter, cantor Simon and Walter, the archdeacon of Borsova appeared before Archbishop Thomas – Martin's superior – in May 1315 and requested the transcription of the aforementioned promissory charter of Martin (1307). The archbishop complied with the request, yet Martin did not return the privileges to the chapter. Farkas considers the chapter was not uniform on the issue, Martin had loyal collegiate members too.

Two years later, in 1317, Simon and Walter again visited the archiepiscopal court in Esztergom. As envoys of the cathedral chapter, they filed a lawsuit against Martin. They complained that Martin and his predecessors – Lampert Hont-Pázmány and Andrew – unlawfully seized tithes of altogether approximately 50 villages in Abaúj, Borsod, Ung and Szerencs counties, which belonged to the revenues of the Eger Chapter. Furthermore, the canons also accused Martin of occupying tithes in the settlements east of the Eger stream in the Eger Valley between present-day Bélapátfalva and Egerfarmos, while only the west coast belonged to the bishop. Archbishop Thomas instructed the Vác Chapter to summon Martin before their court. However, he did not appear in person after three summonses in Buda, Heves County and sent his prothonotary Peter Abaynch instead of himself. When Thomas sent his bailiffs to investigate the conflict, Martin did not react materially to the allegations and did not make any arguments in defense of his own right. Martin even threatened implicitly his superior, Archbishop Thomas that bypassing the ecclesiastical hierarchy, he appeals directly to the Holy See in the litigation process, in the event of an unfavorable judgment for him. Finally, Martin appeared before the court of Archbishop Thomas personally, while the chapter was represented by Simon. In addition to the clerical staff of the Archdiocese of Esztergom, the audition, took place in late August 1317, was also attended by apostolic nuncio Fulgentius, which prompted the bishop to retreat. Martin agreed to recover the aforementioned confiscated tithes – except Nagyolaszi (Vlachy, Slovakia) – to the Eger Chapter.

== Last years ==
Around the same time with the lawsuit between Martin and his cathedral chapter, the Hungarian monarch concluded a short-lived peace with the oligarch Matthew Csák, who thus was able to retain several captured Church properties in Upper Hungary, which had mostly belonged to the Archdiocese of Esztergom and its suffragans. Archbishop Thomas strongly protested against the agreement. In response to Charles' actions, who seized church incomes to finance his war against the oligarchs, the prelates of the realm – including Martin – summoned a national synod to Kalocsa and made an alliance in the spring of 1318 against all who would jeopardize their interests. According to István Sugár, the need for united action by the prelates in national politics at the turn of 1317 and 1318 put severe pressure on Martin to retreat from his stubborn stance during the trial. Martin issued a charter in April 1319, in which he formally closed his conflict with the Eger Chapter. Accordingly, the chapter waived payment of costs, and the bishop withdrew his appeal to the Roman Curia. Martin fully complied with the decision of Archbishop Thomas, and even undertook to pay a serious sum (300 and 15 additional silver marks for the costs) in the event of a breach of this.

Martin transcribed and confirmed the 1317 donation letter of the Augustinian friars at Diósgyőr in July 1318. According to József Leskó, Martin employed three vicars throughout his episcopate in his court: Walter, the archdeacon of Borsova, Dominic, the archdeacon of Abaúj and Peter, the provost of Mislye (Myšľa). As before with Amadeus Aba, Martin also sought to establish good relations with Philip Drugeth, the new lord of Northeast Hungary, who was considered the most faithful confidant of Charles. Philip requested the bishop to allow 40 days of absolution to the newly erected St. Ladislaus chapel of the Pauline hermits near Középnémeti in 1319 (today a borough of Milhosť in Slovakia).

Martin was last mentioned as a living person on 8 January 1322, when permitted a certain magister John, son of Michael to prepare a burial place under the St. Michael chapel in Felnémeti (Milhosť). He died still in that year, as his successor Csanád Telegdi was elected unanimously as Bishop of Eger sometime before 8 October 1322.

== Sources ==
- Engel, Pál (1996). Magyarország világi archontológiája, 1301–1457, I. [Secular Archontology of Hungary, 1301–1457, Volume I] (in Hungarian). História, MTA Történettudományi Intézete. ISBN 963-8312-44-0.
- Farkas, Csaba (2020). "Viszály Egerben: Márton püspök és az egri káptalan konfliktusa [Feud in Eger: The Conflict between Bishop Martin and the Eger Chapter]". In Thoroczkay, Gábor (ed.). Püspökök, káptalanok, tizedek: Tanulmányok (in Hungarian). Kronosz Kiadó. pp. 201–220. ISBN 978-615-6048-57-8.
- Kádár, Tamás (2017). "Harcban a koronáért. (II.) I. Károly (Róbert) király uralkodásának 1306–1310 közötti szakasza [Fight for the Crown. The Reign of Charles I (Robert) from 1306 to 1310]". Történeti Tanulmányok. Acta Universitatis Debreceniensis (in Hungarian). 25: 126–192. ISSN 1217-4602.
- Sugár, István (1984). Az egri püspökök története [The History of the Bishops of Eger] (in Hungarian). Szent István Társulat. ISBN 963-360-392-7.

Catholic Church titles
Preceded by Andrew	Bishop of Eger; 1306–1322	Succeeded by Csanád Telegdi
