= St Charles Borromeo Seminary =

Kňazský seminár sv. Karola Boromejského
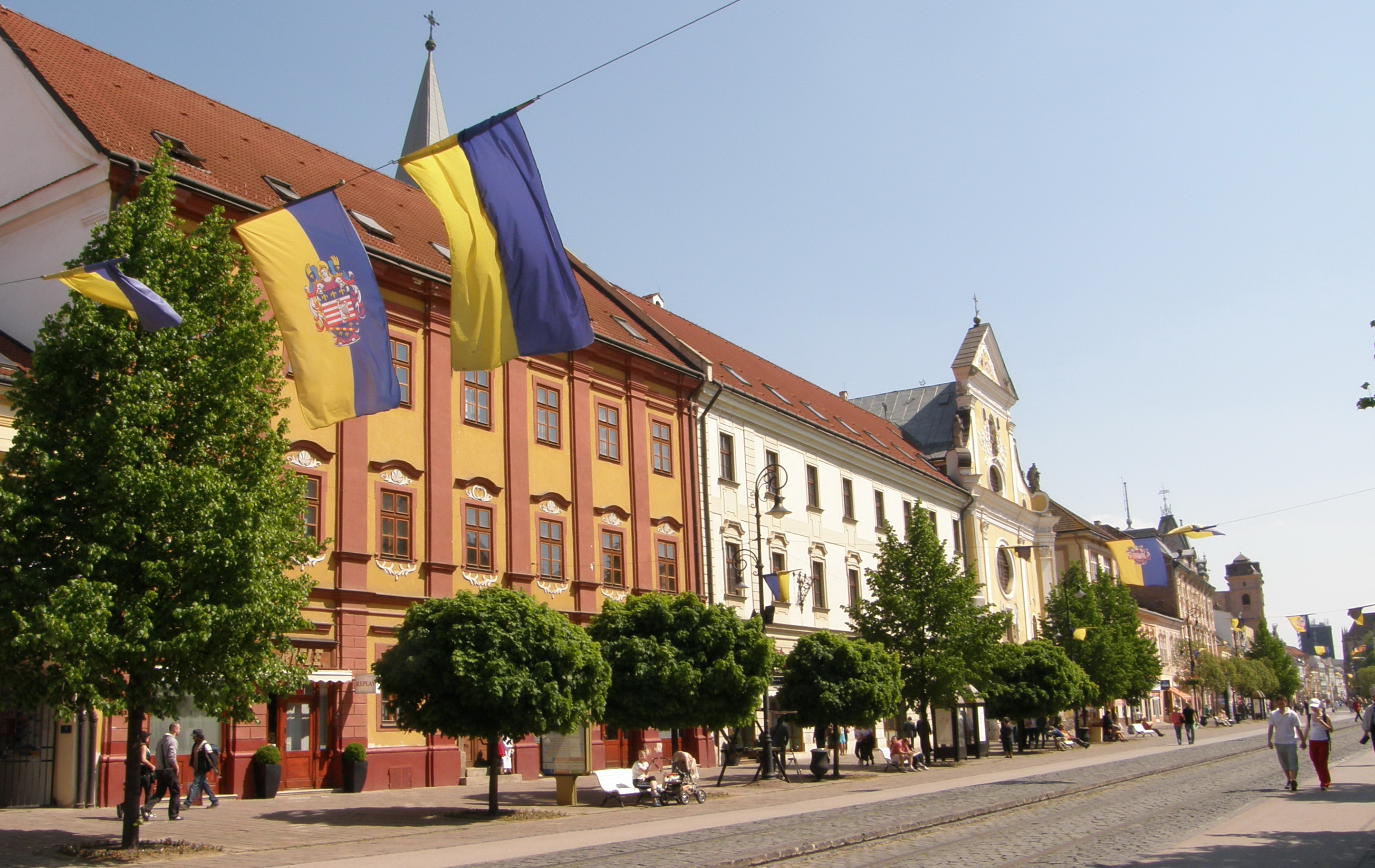
- St Charles Borromeo Seminary

Location
- Hlavná 91; 042 03; Košice; Slovakia

Information
- Type: Roman Catholic seminary
- Patron saint: St Charles Borromeo
- Established: 16 Sept 1811 (215 ya); 26 Jul 1950 liquidated 4 Oct 1994 (32 ya) renewed
- Rector: Štefan Novotný
- Faculty: Theology
- Enrollment: 28 (2017/18)
- Nickname: KSKE
- Affiliations: Roman Catholic Church
- Website: kske.sk

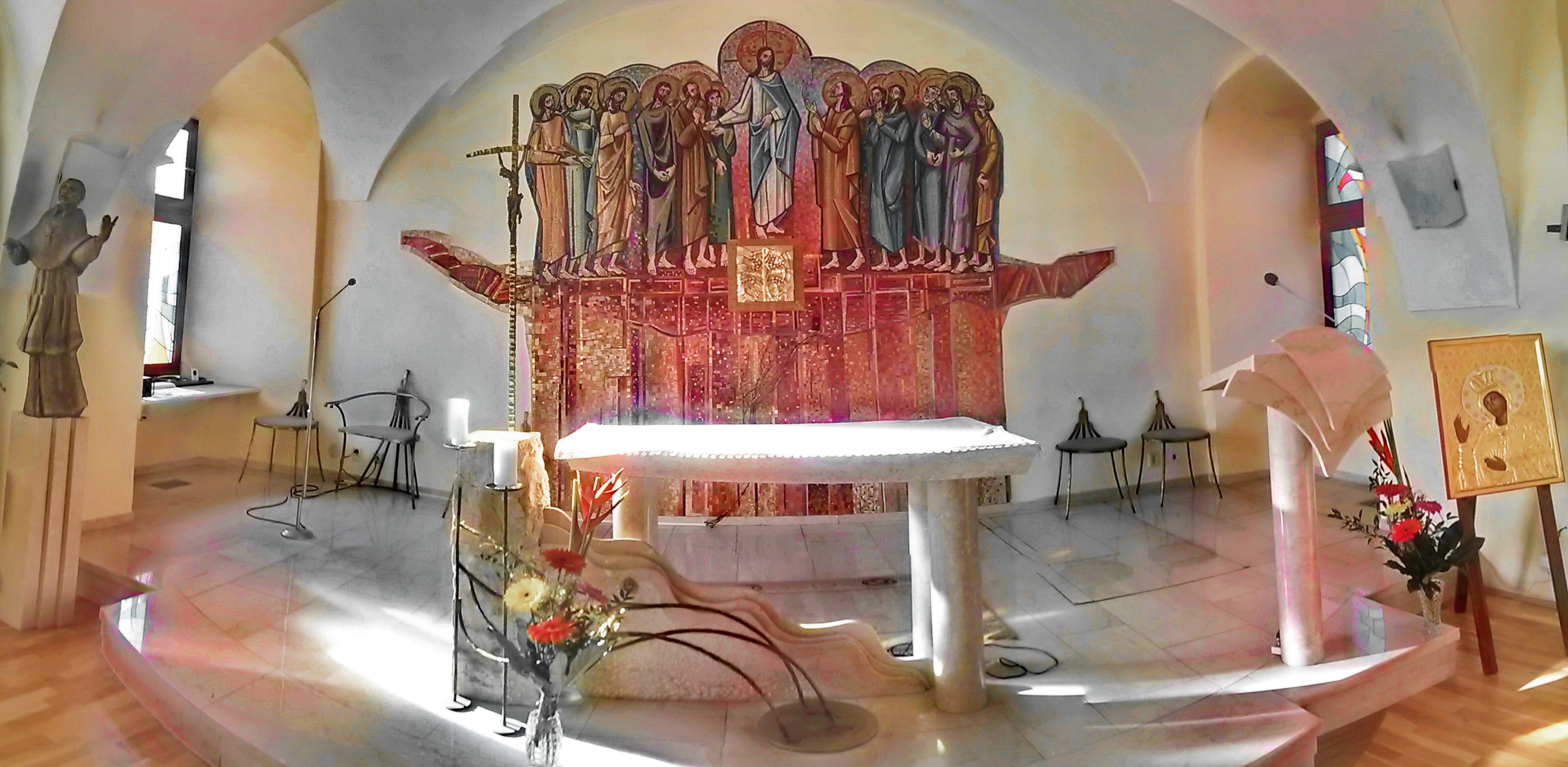
St Charles Borromeo Seminary Chapel in Košice

St Charles Borromeo Seminary (Slovak: Kňazský seminár sv. Karola Boromejského) is the Roman Catholic Major Seminary of the Archdiocese of Košice in Košice, Slovakia.

The Seminary is located on Main street directly in downtown Košice, Slovakia. It has five floors. The first three are the Faculty of Theology of the Catholic University in Ružomberok. The seminary is on the fourth and fifth floors of the building, which consists of the St Charles Borromeo Seminary Chapel, the seminarians rooms, Borromeo Magazine editorial office, a meditation room, a small gym, a billiard room, infirmary rooms, and the seminary kitchen.

A number of priests reside in the seminary building who most of them teach on the Faculty of Theology.

During the first two years, the seminarians focus on philosophical studies and the remaining three years focus on theological studies. Between second and third year, the seminarians take a pastoral year lasting one academic school year where they work in an assigned parish. This accounts for a total of 5 years of formation in the seminary, and 2 years of formation outside the seminary (pastoral year, diaconate year). At the end of every academic year, in June, the fifth year seminarians are ordained to the diaconate and serve within the Archdiocese of Košice. The following June, having completed one year of service as deacons, they are ordained to the priesthood.

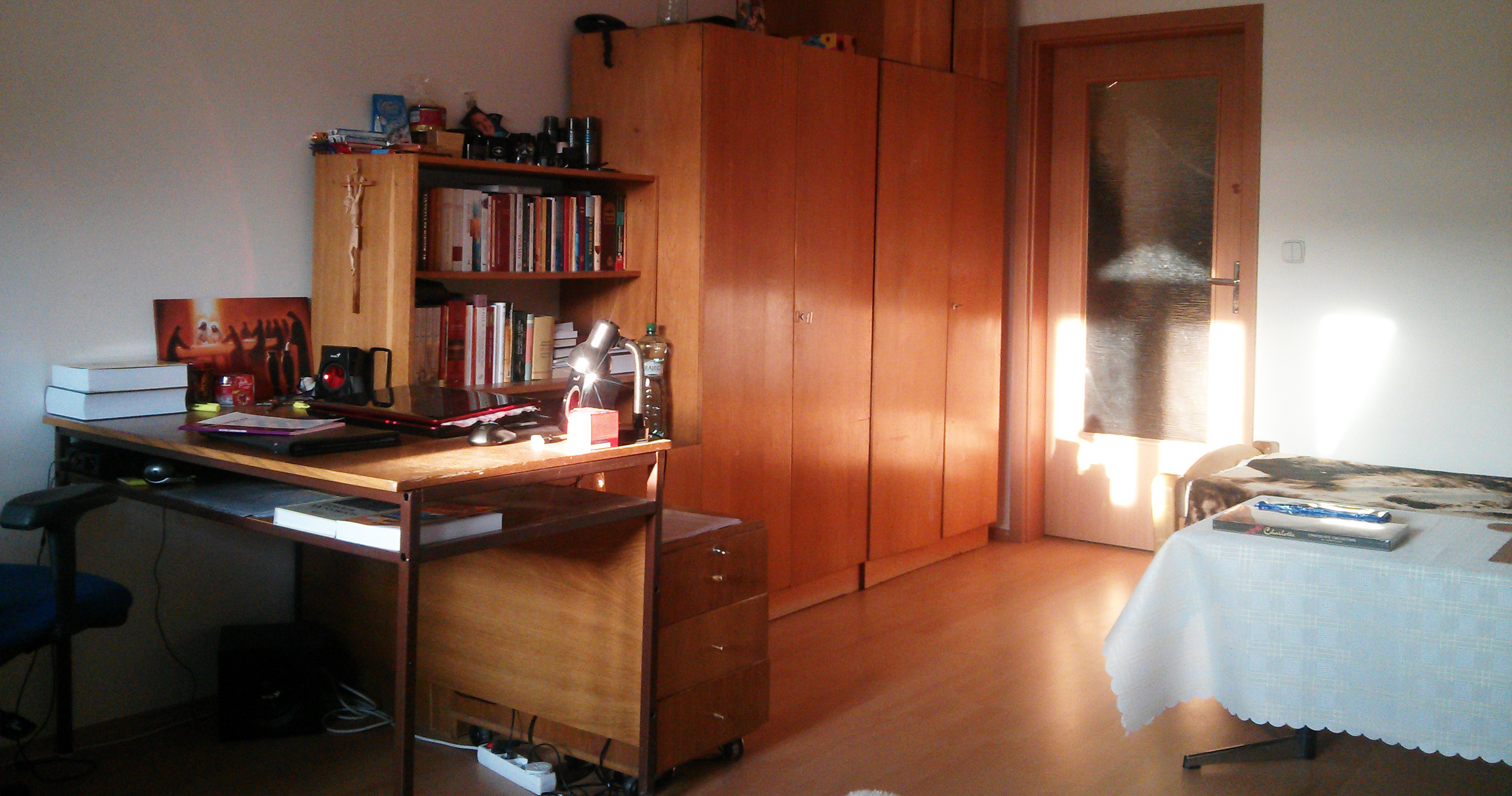
Typical present day seminary room

== History ==
Before the establishment of an independent diocese in 1804, the territory of the current Metropolitan Archdiocese of Košice belonged to the Diocese of Eger. In 1347 the city received privileges from Louis the Great, and made Košice ranked second among all cities in Hungary.

The city was inspired by the Reformation. After a city fire on April 13, 1556 the Dominicans and Franciscans left Košice. The Catholics in Košice were left without priests. During the pontificate of Pope Gregory XIII, the papal diplomat António Possevino SJ stayed and worked in Košice from September to December 1583. It was he that stressed in a letter to Pope Gregory XIII, about the urgent need to set up a seminary in Košice, to form Catholic priests. However, his proposal was not realized at that time.

=== Kisdyanum Seminary in Košice ===
Benedikt Kisdy, the bishop of Eger canonically established the University of Košice on February 26, 1657 in Jasov and entrusted it to the care and administration of the Jesuit order. Emperor Leopold I with his Bulla aurea (Golden Bull) confirmed this university on August 7, 1660 in Graz. However, the university's Faculty of Theology could not exist without a seminary. The founding charter for the establishment of the Seminary was issued by Bishop Thomas Pálfy on June 4, 1664 in Košice. St Ladislaus became the patron saint of the seminary, which became known as the Kisdyanum - by his benefactor, Bishop Benedikt Kisdy. The Kisdyanum building was located on 2 Alžbetina Street (now Building Investment and Development Bank). The Kisdyanum adopted the rules and regulations for its seminary formation from the Pázmáneum in Vienna. At the Kisdyanum, the seminarians were formed by Jesuits for the Diocese of Eger and took their courses at the University. There were on average 40 seminarians for the diocese, in addition to many seminarians of various religious orders such as the Jesuits (around 20 seminarians) as well as Franciscans and Premonstratensians. The Kisdyanum Seminary was active alongside the newer seminary in Eger (since 1709), which both formed seminarians to the priesthood for the Diocese of Eger. The Kisdyanum was active until 1760, when the bishop of Eger, František Barkóczy liquidated it, sold the building, and used the funds for the seminary in Eger. The University of Košice existed until 1777, when on August 27, 1777 Maria Theresa issued a decree Ratio Educationis that demanded only one university in the kingdom, and that in Buda.

=== Creation of the Diocese of Košice and St Charles Borromeo Seminary ===
The Holy Roman Emperor, Francis II, exercising his power as Apostolic Emperor, divided the Diocese of Eger on February 23, 1804, created the dioceses of Košice and Szatmária, and elevated the diocese of Eger to an archdiocese. The Diocese of Košice became suffragan to the Archdiocese of Eger. Pope Pius VII confirmed the splitting of the diocese of Eger on August 9, 1804 in the bull: In Universi gregis Dominica cura. Francis II also demanded, that every diocese in the kingdom is to have its own seminary to form seminarians for its diocese. Consequently, the construction of the new Seminary in Košice began in 1805. Seminarians starting their first year of theology were in Košice by 1809, even though the building was not yet completed. At the beginning of the 1811/12 academic school year, the seminary building was blessed by the first bishop of the Košice Diocese, Msgr. Andrej Szabó † (20 Aug 1804 Appointed - 28 Sep 1819 Died). Out of respect to the first rector Karol Rajner, the seminary was entrusted to the patronage of Saint Charles Borromeo and was named St Charles Borromeo Seminary (Slovak: Kňazský seminár sv. Karola Boromejského). It was also this academic school year that for the first time had a complete seminary - seminarians in all grades.

=== The Seminary during World War II and the First Slovak Republic ===
The Seminary experienced a difficult time following the First Vienna Award in 1938, which was the result of the First Vienna Arbitration, a direct consequence of the Munich Agreement, which separated Košice and its surroundings from CzechoSlovakia and gave it to Hungary. Most seminarians, wanting to remain Slovaks, left Košice and continued studying theology in various other diocesan seminaries in Slovakia. There remained only nine seminarians in the Seminary who were originally from the Košice region. These nine Slovaks were joined by the Hungarian seminarians from the Archdiocese of Eger. Most of the superiors and professors of the Seminary in Košice were of Hungarian nationality.

With the moving of state borders in 1938 along with the creation of the First Slovak Republic in 1939 and consequently the moving of borders of ecclesiastical provinces, Košice and the Seminary suddenly found themselves part of the Ecclesiastical Province of Eger. Following those events, the apostolic administrator of the Diocese of Košice, Joseph Čársky, Titular Bishop of Thagora (the see of Košice was officially vacant since 1925), because of Canon Law regulations, had to leave Košice on September 8, 1939 and by the papal bull Dioecesium fine was appointed to Prešov as the Košice Apostolic Administrator of those parts of the dioceses of Košice, Szatmária and Rožňava which still remained in Slovakia after all border changes. Bishop Stephen Madarász came to Košice on September 16, 1939 as the new Bishop of the Diocese of Košice which now belonged to Hungary.

=== The Liquidation of the Seminary in Košice ===
After the return of Košice from Hungary to CzechoSlovakia in 1945, the Diocese of Košice was entrusted once again to Bishop Joseph Čársky (apostolic administrator from 1925 to 1939, and from 1945 to 1962). The superiors of the Seminary left with their bishop back to Hungary. Due to war conditions, Bishop Joseph Čársky set up the Seminary in September 1945. The Seminary did not last very long after the war. With the rise of communism, formation and studies in the Seminary in Košice were terminated in June 1950. The seminarians could complete their exams only on the basis of the decisions of the state authorities, to enroll in separate organized courses. Whereas the seminarians declined to participate in such activities, they were called into special military units. At the end of the school year, as a call to false reports, everyone in the seminary including the superiors, professors, and seminarians were locked by police force into the seminary chapel, and the police examined the entire building in search of weapons hidden in the building. No weapons were ever found, regardless the Seminary was to be liquidated. On July 10, 1950 Bishop Joseph Čársky was notified by the Slovak Seizure Office for Ecclesiastical Affairs, that St Charles Borromeo Seminary in Košice is to be liquidated, and its superiors will be issued to spiritual administration in the diocese. On July 11 and 12, 1950 the seminary building was written over to the socialist government. The buildings being in usable condition were taken by the Regional National Committee of Ecclesiastical Separation in Košice. The seminary buildings were used by many schools and organizations and later became a Conservatory and Home for Young People. The beautiful seminary garden was destroyed and transformed into a parking lot. By government decree 112/1950 on July 26, 1950, after 159 years of forming seminarians into priests, the Seminary was definitely liquidated. The seminarians were not to return and in fact, had no school to return to. Only part of the seminarians were allowed to move to Bratislava and complete their studies in the only communist regime allowed seminary in Slovakia: Sts. Cyril and Methodius Seminary (Slovak: Kňazský seminár sv. Cyrila a Metoda). The other seminarians, who were not allowed to continue their studies had to find some other school or many tried to find work. Admittance to the Sts. Cyril and Methodius Seminary in Bratislava was closely under surveillance by the communist regime. Many young men from all over Slovakia, wanting to become priests did not give up hope and every year applied to the Seminary in Bratislava, though many times with no avail. Meanwhile, waiting to be accepted to the Seminary in Bratislava, these young men found jobs wherever possible, always hoping. Some of them eventually married.

Among those accepted to the Sts. Cyril and Methodius Seminary in Bratislava is Archbishop Emeritus of the Archdiocese of Košice Msgr. Alojz Tkáč. For three years he tried to apply to the Seminary in Bratislava, always with no answer. Meanwhile, he studied at the Faculty of Philosophy at the Comenius University in Bratislava. The young Alojz Tkáč was finally accepted on his fourth application to the seminary and enrolled there into the 1953/54 academic school year.

=== Renewal of St Charles Borromeo Seminary ===
After the fall of communism in 1989, following the Act on the Mitigation of certain property injustices, the Diocese of Košice on January 23, 1992 once again became the owner of the seminary building. On Holy Thursday, April 16, 1992 Bishop Msgr. Alojz Tkáč for the first time publicly expressed his intention to renew St Charles Borromeo Seminary in Košice. On April 5, 1993 Msgr. Anton Konečný referred to Bishop Msgr. Alojz Tkáč the condition of the seminary building and its possible restoration. From June to September 1993 the Conservatory and Home for Young People moved out. On July 31, 1993 Msgr. Anton Konečný was appointed rector of the Seminary Church - St Anthony of Padua. On March 31, 1994 according to the 1983 Code of Canon Law, by Cann. 232, 233, and 237, Bishop Msgr. Alojz Tkáč renewed St Charles Borromeo Seminary. As the first rector of the renewed seminary, or 23rd rector since 1811, he named Msgr. Anton Konečný and as vice-rector Mgr. Jozef Ondovčák. Reparations began immediately, as the building was in desolate conditions. Accepted into the first academic year (1994/95) were 31 seminarians of various ages, even those, who for many years tried to enroll to the Seminary in Bratislava but unsuccessfully. The new seminarians arrived to the renewed Seminary in Košice on Monday September 26, 1994. The glorious opening of St Charles Borromeo Seminary in Košice took place on October 4, 1994 with the pontifical Te Deum Holy Mass celebrated by Metropolitan Archbishop Msgr. Ján Sokol and con-celebrated by Msgr. Alojz Tkáč (Bishop of the Diocese of Košice) who also said the homily, Msgr. Bernard Bober (Auxiliary Bishop of the Diocese of Košice), Msgr. Eduard Kojnok (Bishop of the Diocese of Rožňava), Msgr. František Tondra (Bishop of the Diocese of Spiš), and Msgr. Andrej Imrich (Auxiliary Bishop of the Diocese of Spiš). On October 15, 1994 Bishop Msgr. Alojz Tkáč blessed the new Seminary Chapel with patronage of St Charles Borromeo.

=== Pope John Paul II's papal visit to the Seminary in Košice ===
On March 31, 1995 at noon in the Seminary Chapel, Bishop Msgr. Alojz Tkáč and Pope John Paul II at St Peter's Square simultaneously announced together, that the Holy See had created the new Ecclesiastical Province of Košice with its seat in Košice. At that same moment, Msgr. Alojz Tkáč was appointed as Metropolitan Archbishop of the new Ecclesiastical Province of Košice and so, the status of the Diocese of Košice was changed to Archdiocese of Košice - suffragan dioceses: Spiš and Rožňava. The following year in 1995, the Holy See and Pope John Paul II planned a papal visit of the new Ecclesiastical Province of Košice. While the Roman Pontiff was to be in Košice, Bishop Msgr. Alojz Tkáč wished for him to reside in the new St Charles Borromeo Seminary. This urged the city of Košice to help and speed up the repairs of the seminary building. On July 2, 1995, Pope John Paul II celebrated an open-air Papal Holy Mass at the Košice Airport with 400,000 people present. During that Papal Holy Mass in Košice, John Paul II beatified the Three Košice Martyrs and also bestowed the pallium to the new Metropolitan Archbishop Msgr. Alojz Tkáč. John Paul II resided a short while in the St Charles Borromeo Seminary, walked the renewed hallways, prayed in the St Charles Borromeo Seminary Chapel, and rested in one of the guest rooms.

== Rectors since 1811 ==
Since its birth in 1811, the St Charles Borromeo Seminary has had 26 rectors in total. From 1811 to 1950 there have been 22 rectors:

- Karol Rajner (1811-1818)
- Ján König (1818-1819)
- Jozef Paldián (1819-1824)
- František Turcsányi (1824-1833)
- Ján Gálcsik (1833-1847)
- Adam Szolcsányi (1847-1850)
- Matúš Marczényi (1850-1857)
- František Szabad (1857-1863)
- Ján Krausz (1863-1880)
- Karol Vandráscek (1881-1886)
- František Pagács (1886-1896)
- Andrej Magócsy (1896-1897)
- Karol Belky (1897-1902)
- Michal Krajnik (1902-1915)
- Bishop Augustín Fischer-Colbrie (April 5, 1905 - January 31, 1906)
- Msgr. Štefan Hartsár (1915 - June 30, 1920)
- Dr. Arnold Hoffmann (July 1, 1920 - August 31, 1922)
- Rudolf Prónay (September 1, 1922 - August 6, 1939)
- Dr. Vojtech Wick (August 9, 1939 - August 31, 1941)
- Dr. Jozef Aurel Vécsey (September 1, 1941 - 1945)
- Dr. Jakub Šefčík (June 1, 1945 - September 30, 1946)
- Msgr. Ján Onderúv (October 1, 1946 - July 12, 1950)

On July 12, 1950 the Seminary was liquidated by the communist regime which lasted for 44 years. The Seminary was renewed by Mons. Alojz Tkáč in 1994.

- Msgr. Anton Konečný (March 31, 1994 - June 30, 2003)
- Msgr. Jozef Ondovčák (July 1, 2003 - June 30, 2008)
- František Katriňák (July 1, 2008 - June 30, 2013)
- Štefan Novotný (July 1, 2013 – present)

== Coat of arms ==
The coat of arms of the Seminary in Košice is divided vertically. The left part depicts half of the coat of arms of the Košice archdiocese to whom the seminary belongs. The right part depicts the attributes of the patron saint of the seminary - St Charles Borromeo.

The Archdiocese of Košice coat of arms is a gold St Andrew's cross on a blue background. St Andrew the Apostle is the patron saint of the Archdiocese of Košice. The upper part has a golden lily, which symbolizes Košice and the other three gold roses symbolize the three arch-deaneries: Abov - cathedral, Šariš and Zemplín.

The attributes of St Charles Borromeo are a silver cardinal's hat on a red background, which symbolizes the cardinalate.

Top-center of the coat of arms is the Book of the Gospels with the Greek letters Alpha and Omega, symbolizing Jesus Christ. An open book of the Gospels is also a symbol for seminaries.

Combining these themes gave birth to the coat of arms of the seminary.

== See also ==
- Archdiocese of Košice
- St Anthony of Padua Seminary Church, Košice
