= Emeric (bishop of Várad) =

Hungarian prelate

- Bishop of Várad
- Installed: 1297
- Term ended: 1317
- Predecessor: Benedict
- Successor: Ivánka

Personal details
- Died: 14 November 1317
- Denomination: Roman Catholic

Emeric (Hungarian: Imre; died 14 November 1317) was a Hungarian prelate at the turn of the 13th and 14th centuries, who served as Bishop of Várad (present-day Oradea, Romania) from 1297 until his death.

== Early life ==
His parentage is unknown. He had a brother named Lucas, who donated his unidentified lands to the Diocese of Várad (present-day Oradea Mare, Romania) in his last will and testament. Lucas owned the land of Százd in Hont County (today Sazdice, Slovakia), which he pledged to certain nobles, comes Stephen and Herbord, sons of Ibor, but he failed to elicit the estate by 1299.

There is no any record of his potential university studies. It is plausible that Emeric functioned as lector in the Diocese of Várad prior to his bishopric, mentioned in this capacity from 1281 to 1285. He participated in the election of Bishop Thomas in 1282. The people of Olaszi (today Olosig, part of Oradea), Újfalu and Szentlőrinc in Bihar County, considered themselves as the personal serfs of Bishop Bartholomew, refused to pay customs to the cathedral chapter in 1285, which referred to an old tradition while demanded it. During the lawsuit, the bishop entrusted three canons, lector Emeric, Francis, the archdeacon of Bihar and canon Jonah, to swear to this old supposed privilege on 11 June. Although the people refused to acknowledge the validity of the oath, Bartholomew confirmed the cathedral chapter's right of collection of customs. It is dubious whether Emeric is identical with that namesake canon, who acted as a notary of Bishop Benedict in 1292.

== Bishop of Várad ==
=== Political commitment ===
Emeric was elected Bishop of Várad by the summer of 1297 (nevertheless, the cathedral chapter's official list of bishops incorrectly dated his election to the year 1300). Despite the pro-Angevin efforts of Archbishop Gregory Bicskei, the overwhelming majority of the Hungarian prelates with the leadership of Archbishop John Hont-Pázmány, also including Emeric, remained supporters of King Andrew III of Hungary against the pretender Charles of Anjou. Consequently, Emeric was also present at the Diet in Pest in the summer of 1298, which declared Andrew as the rightful king and, among others, established a four-member lesser council within the royal council, consisting of two nobles and prelates. When Bicskei, in contrast, convened a synod to Veszprém with his self-declared authority of papal legate, and obliged the bishops to participate at the event, the prelates, including Emeric refused to attend. On 6 July 1299, Emeric was commissioned to send a letter to Pope Boniface VIII to interpret the complaints of Andrew III, Archbishop John and the "entire prelacy and nobility" regarding the behavior of Bicskei and asked Boniface to place them under papal patronage against the metropolitan of Esztergom.

Andrew III died in 1301. With his death, the House of Árpád, the first royal dynasty of Hungary, ended. A period of Interregnum and civil war between various claimants to the throne – Charles of Anjou], Wenceslaus of Bohemia, and Otto of Bavaria – followed Andrew's death and lasted for seven years. Despite Charles' invalid coronation performed by Bicskei in the spring of 1301, the overwhelming majority of the prelates, including Emeric supported the claim of Wenceslaus. Emeric was a member of that delegation which traveled to Bohemia in July 1301 to offer the Hungarian throne to the young prince. He was present at the coronation of Wenceslaus on 27 August 1301. Pope Boniface sent his legate, Niccolò Boccasini, to Hungary. In October 1301, he summoned and convinced the majority of the Hungarian prelates to accept Charles's reign. By 31 May 1303, when the pope declared Charles the lawful king of Hungary, Emeric also belonged to the partisans of the Capetian House of Anjou. In that year, Emeric wrote a letter to Albert I of Germany, in which he requested the monarch to provide assistance to his relative Charles in his struggle for the Hungarian throne. On behalf of the papal legate Gentile Portino da Montefiore, Emeric negotiated with the Transylvanian provincial lord Ladislaus Kán in February 1309, but the powerful baron refused to hand over the Holy Crown of Hungary. Emeric was also present and contributed in the second coronation of Charles I on 15 June 1309.

During the era of feudal anarchy, Hungary had disintegrated into a dozen provinces, each headed by a powerful nobleman, or oligarch. Almost the whole territory of the Diocese of Várad belonged to the sphere of interest of James Borsa, a strong domestic supporter of Charles since the early 1300s. Their relationship was initially cooperative; for instance, the oligarch provided armed protection to the bishop's merchants, who arrived with chariots from Kassa (present-day Košice, Slovakia) in 1310, when they were attacked and robbed by some members of the local branch of the gens (clan) Gutkeled. After James Borsa and his family turned against Charles I in late 1314 or early 1315, the Diocese of Várad was constantly harassed by looting, plundering raids and loss of church property and goods due to attacks of Borsa and their allies, and the subsequent war situation during Charles' royal campaign against the rebellious oligarchs. After the defeat of James Borsa in the Battle of Debrecen, Emeric and several members of his cathedral chapter attended the provincial diet at Szalacs (today Sălacea, Romania) in August 1317, held by royal special judge Dózsa Debreceni for the nobles of Bihar, Szabolcs, Szatmár, Szolnok and Kraszna counties.

=== Ecclesiastical affairs ===
Emeric is first mentioned as Bishop of Várad in July 1297, when he confirmed his predecessor Bartholomew's verdict regarding the chapter's right of collection of duties over the aforementioned three villages upon the request of the ecclesiastical body. The cathedral chapter was also granted the one third of the income of the salt mines at Belényes (present-day Beiuș, Romania) by Emeric (the estate and its mines were acquired by one his predecessors Lodomer two decades ago). The bishop provided several tax benefit to the burghers and hospes of Várad by reduction of agricultural benefits in 1312. Emeric built and consecrated the St. Andrew Church, a Gothic hall church in Debrecen (present-day the Reformed Great Church stands in that place). According to some historians, the erection of the church was initiated by the illustrious military general Dózsa Debreceni or his father, Andrew with the contribution of Emeric. In accordance with the narration of a charter from 1320, Emeric once lost one of the finger relics of St. Ladislaus I of Hungary in the village of Hévíz. A certain Augustinian friar Egidius (Giles) found the relic and donated it to the Pauline monastery of an island of the river Hernád (Hornád) near Középnémeti (present-day a borough in Tornyosnémeti). The monastery, thereafter, became a new place of pilgrimage.

Demonstrating his prestige and skills in canon law, Emeric acted as an arbiter in various lawsuit during his service as Bishop of Várad. He judged in the long-time dispute of jurisdiction over the sparsely populated Máramaros region (today Maramureș in Romania) between the dioceses of Eger and Transylvania in 1299. As Andrew, Bishop of Eger did not present at the archbishopric chancellery and Emeric conducted on-site inspections among the local noblemen, who mostly supported Peter Monoszló, King Andrew III decided to donate Máramaros to the Diocese of Transylvania. In 1309, Pope Clement V ordered Emeric to protest the interests of Ulrich, rector of the church of Nádas (today Nadeș, Romania) against the Diocese of Transylvania, who arbitrarily raised the annual tax. In the same year, Emeric, alongside other prelates, requested the pope to hand over the fort of Medvedgrad to its original builder and owner, the Bishopric of Zagreb. Together with five other prelates – including John of Nyitra, Nicholas Kőszegi of Győr and Augustin Kažotić of Zagreb – Emeric protested against the oligarch Matthew Csák's plundering raids at the expense of the Archdiocese of Esztergom in 1313. The prelates sent a letter to Pope Clement to inform him and urged Matthew Csák to indemnify Archbishop Thomas. Emeric appeared as a witness in the 1309 trial between several churches and chapters in Transylvania and their nominal superior, the Diocese of Transylvania, which then was under the influence of the provincial lord Ladislaus Kán and his kinship. According to the charges, Kán prevented the local church officials to visit the papal legate Gentile Portino. During the trial, Emeric did not take a stand on either side, emphasizing that he does not make this confession under duress.

Under his episcopate, a certain Demetrius (1294–1305), then Ivánka (1306–1317); his successor as bishop) served as provost of the cathedral chapter of Várad. Before that, Ivánka functioned as lector (1294–1305); he was succeeded by Csanád Telegdi (1306–1317), a future prominent prelate in the 14th-century Hungary. On 12 May 1316, Telegdi was referred to as the vicar and prothonotarius ("principal clerk") of the elderly Emeric (in 1310, James, archdeacon of Békés was mentioned in this capacity). Charles I referred to Emeric as a living person on 12 November 1317. The bishop died two days later, on 14 November, according to the official statues of the Diocese of Várad.

== Sources ==
- Bélfenyéri, Tamás János (2018). ""Vir vite laudabilis." I. Imre (1297–1317), az utolsó Árpád-kori váradi püspök ["Vir vite laudabilis." Emeric I (1297–1317), the Last Bishop of Várad in the Age of Árpáds]". In Tőtős, Áron (ed.). Fejezetek Erdély történetéről (Studia Historica Transylvaniensia 1.) (in Hungarian). Erdélyi Múzeum Egyesület. pp. 175–190. ISBN 978-606-739-101-5.
- Engel, Pál (1996). Magyarország világi archontológiája, 1301–1457, I. [Secular Archontology of Hungary, 1301–1457, Volume I] (in Hungarian). História, MTA Történettudományi Intézete. ISBN 963-8312-44-0.
- Kádár, Tamás (2015). "Harcban a koronáért. I. Károly (Róbert) király uralkodásának első évei 1305 végéig [Fight for the Crown. The First Regnal Years of Charles I (Robert) until the End of 1305]". Történeti Tanulmányok. Acta Universitatis Debreceniensis (in Hungarian). 23: 42–111. ISSN 1217-4602.
- Kádár, Tamás (2017). "Harcban a koronáért. (II.) I. Károly (Róbert) király uralkodásának 1306–1310 közötti szakasza [Fight for the Crown. The Reign of Charles I (Robert) from 1306 to 1310]". Történeti Tanulmányok. Acta Universitatis Debreceniensis (in Hungarian). 25: 126–192. ISSN 1217-4602.
- Zsoldos, Attila (2011). Magyarország világi archontológiája, 1000–1301 [Secular Archontology of Hungary, 1000–1301] (in Hungarian). História, MTA Történettudományi Intézete. ISBN 978-963-9627-38-3.

Catholic Church titles
Preceded by Benedict	Bishop of Várad; 1297–1317	Succeeded by Ivánka
