= St Anthony of Padua Church, Košice =

Church in Košice, Slovakia

St Anthony of Padua Church
- Kostol svätého Antona Paduánskeho
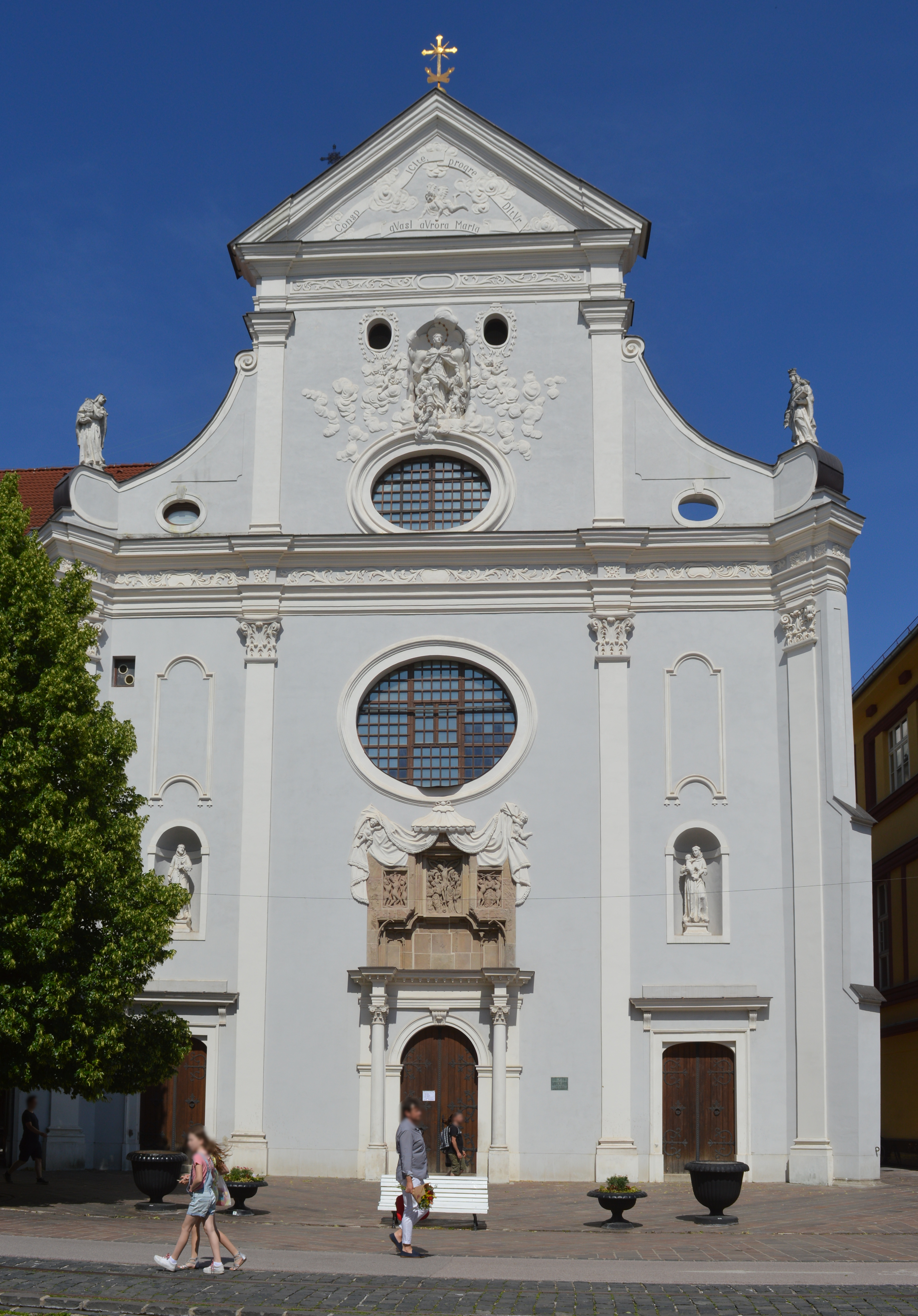
- Interactive map of the St Anthony of Padua Church area

General information
- Architectural style: Gothic, Baroque
- Location: Old Town, Košice, Slovakia
- Coordinates: 48°43′27″N 21°15′24″E
- Year built: 1333–1405
- Construction started: 1718–1724
- Destroyed: 1556

St. Anthony of Padua Church or commonly known as the Franciscan Church (Slovak: Františkánsky kostol) or the Seminary Church (Slovak: Seminárny kostol) at Hlavná ulica (English: Main Street) is the second oldest church in Košice, Slovakia.

== History ==
It was built for Franciscans by the Perényi family from Perín after a big fire in 1333. After the fire in 1556, the church was used as a military store-house. From 1596 to 1671, it was used as a cathedral for the bishop of Eger who settled here during the occupation of Eger by the Ottoman Empire.

When the Diocese of Košice was formed in 1804, the renovated Franciscan monastery became the St Charles Borromeo Seminary.

The monastery is now vacant and Franciscans no longer live there.

== Interior ==
The interior is baroquized, the main altar has a valuable baldachin structure. The statue of Saint Charles Borromeo, a patron of the seminary, is on its cupola. Almost all the altars, the pulpit and other moveables are from years 1760–1770. Its preserved Gothic elements document a plaster Gothic decoration. The reliefs above the entrance, stone seats close to the altar and vaults above the sanctuary and former chancel (dedicated to Saint Nicholas) are original.

The founder of the first University of Košice, the bishop of Eger, Benedikt Kisdy, was buried in the crypt under the main altar. All the crypts were plundered by soldiers after World War II.

== Galéria ==
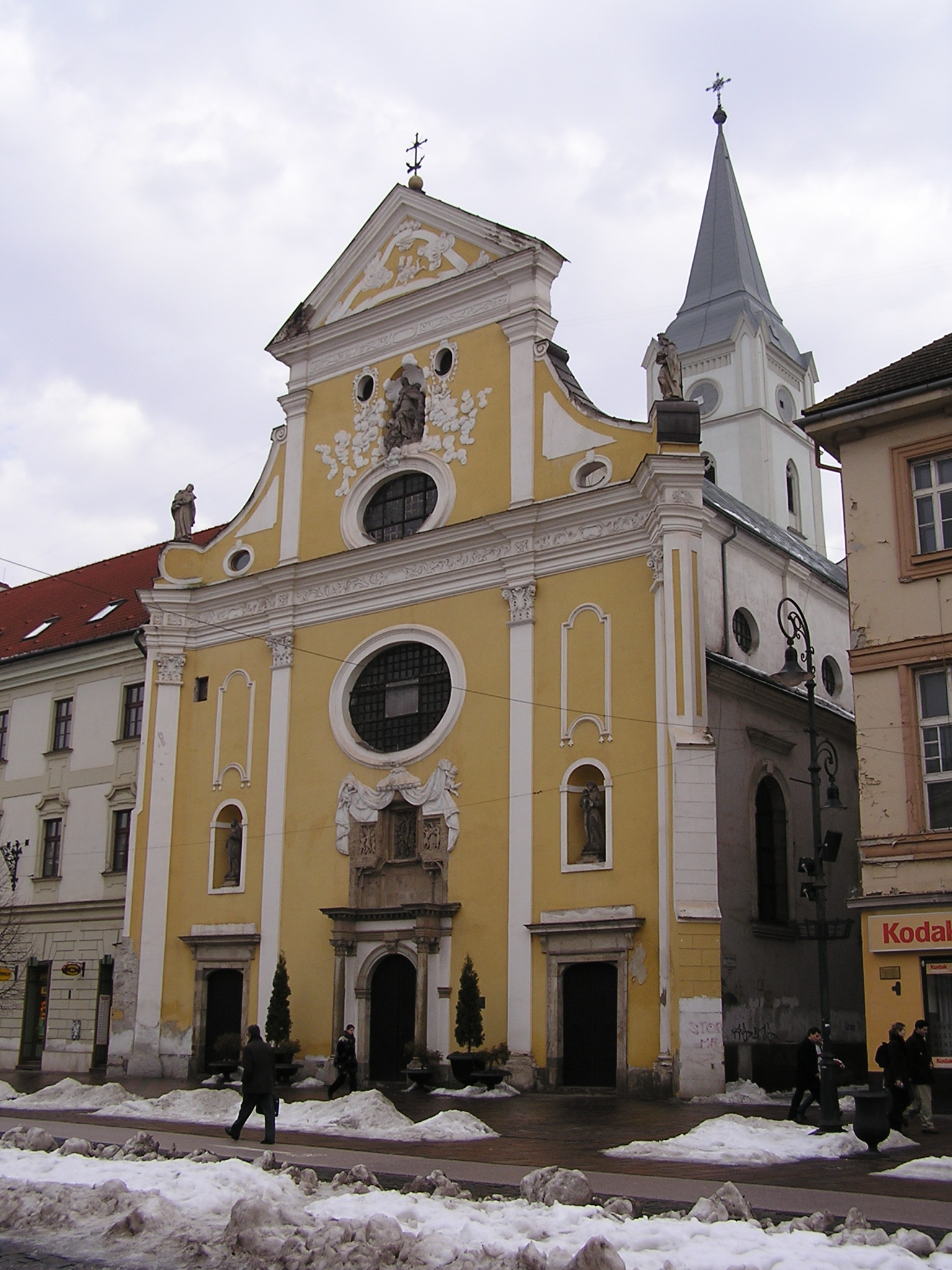
Old facade, 2006

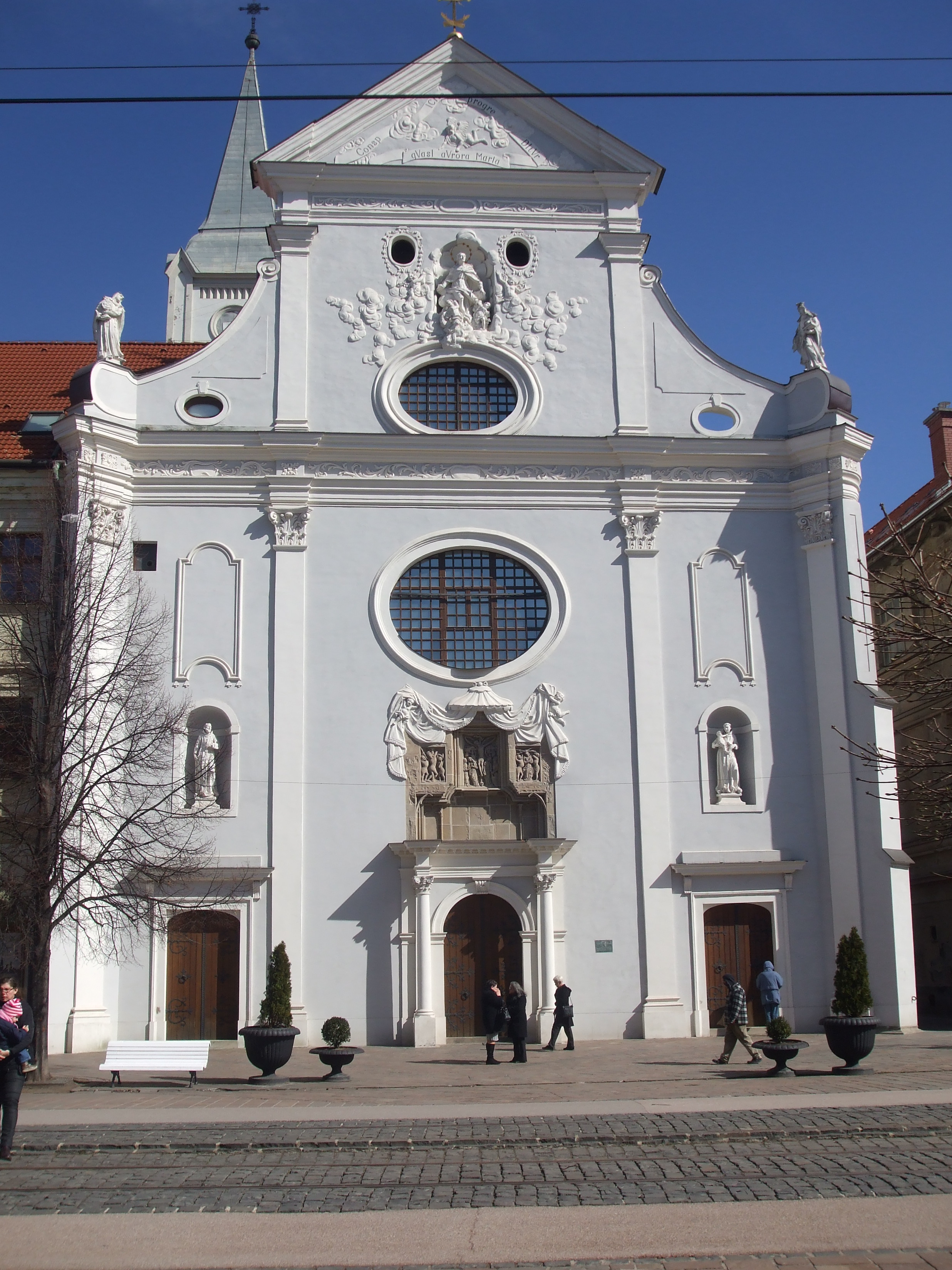
Facade

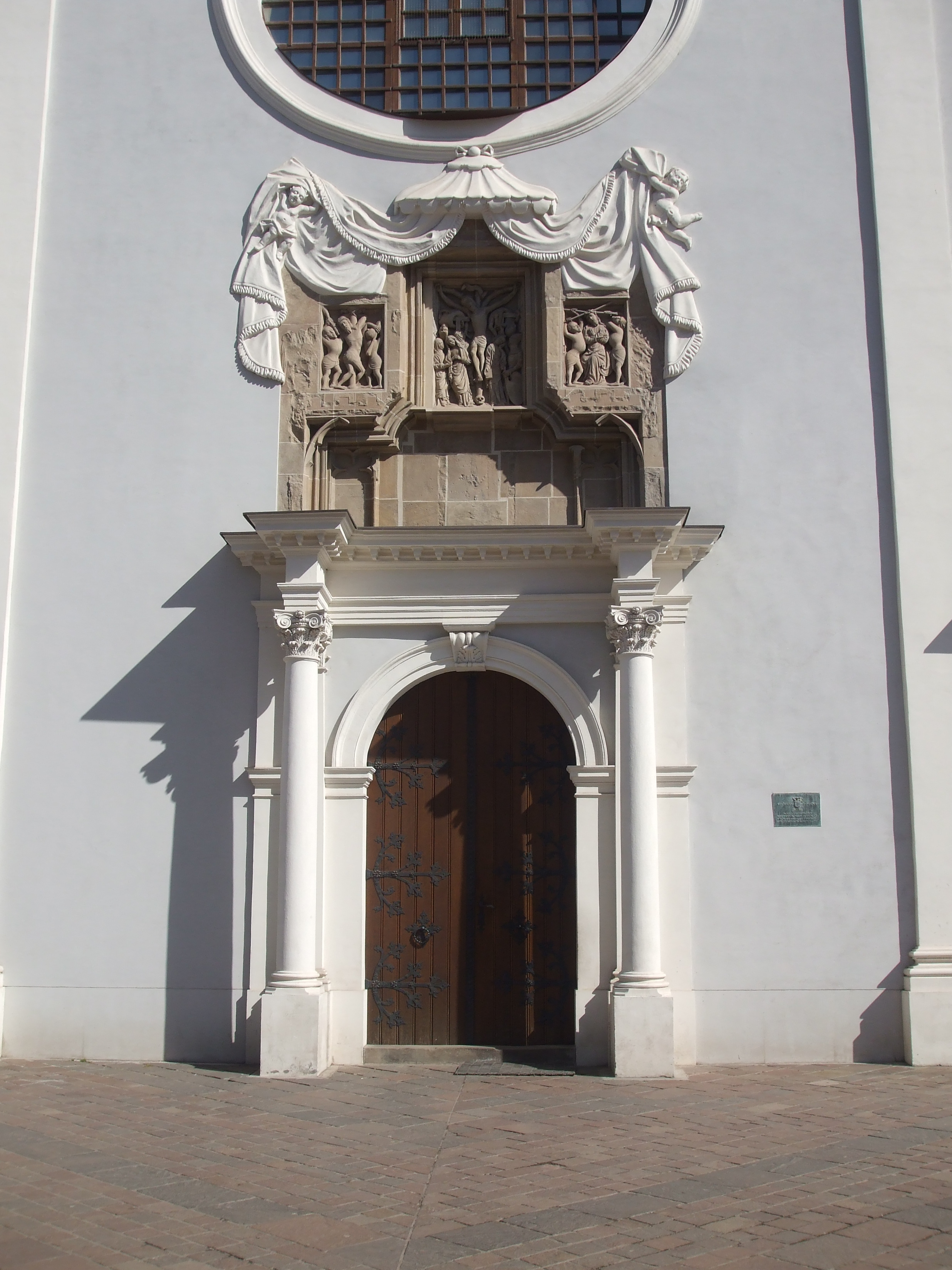
Main portal

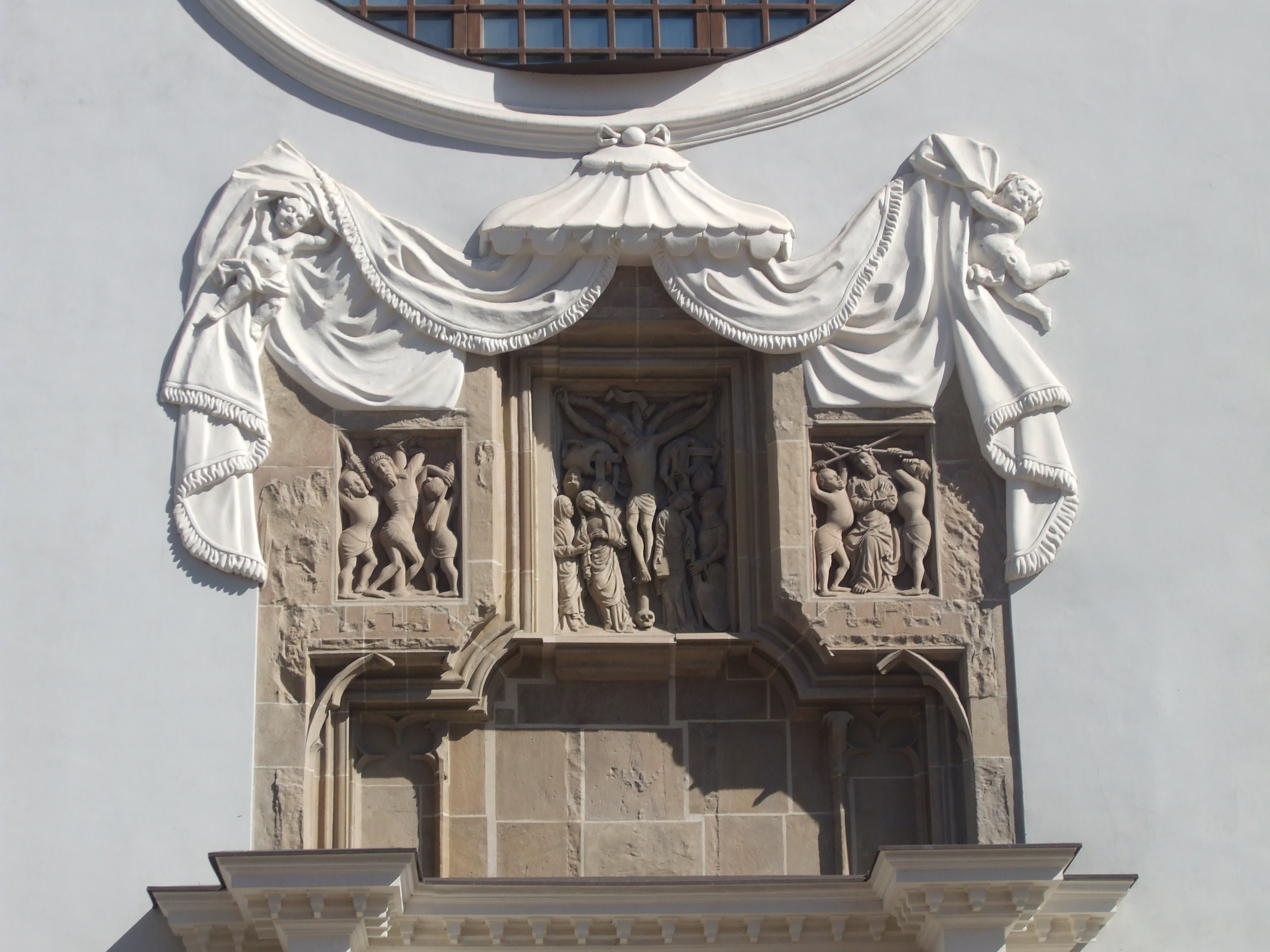
Gothic relief above the portal

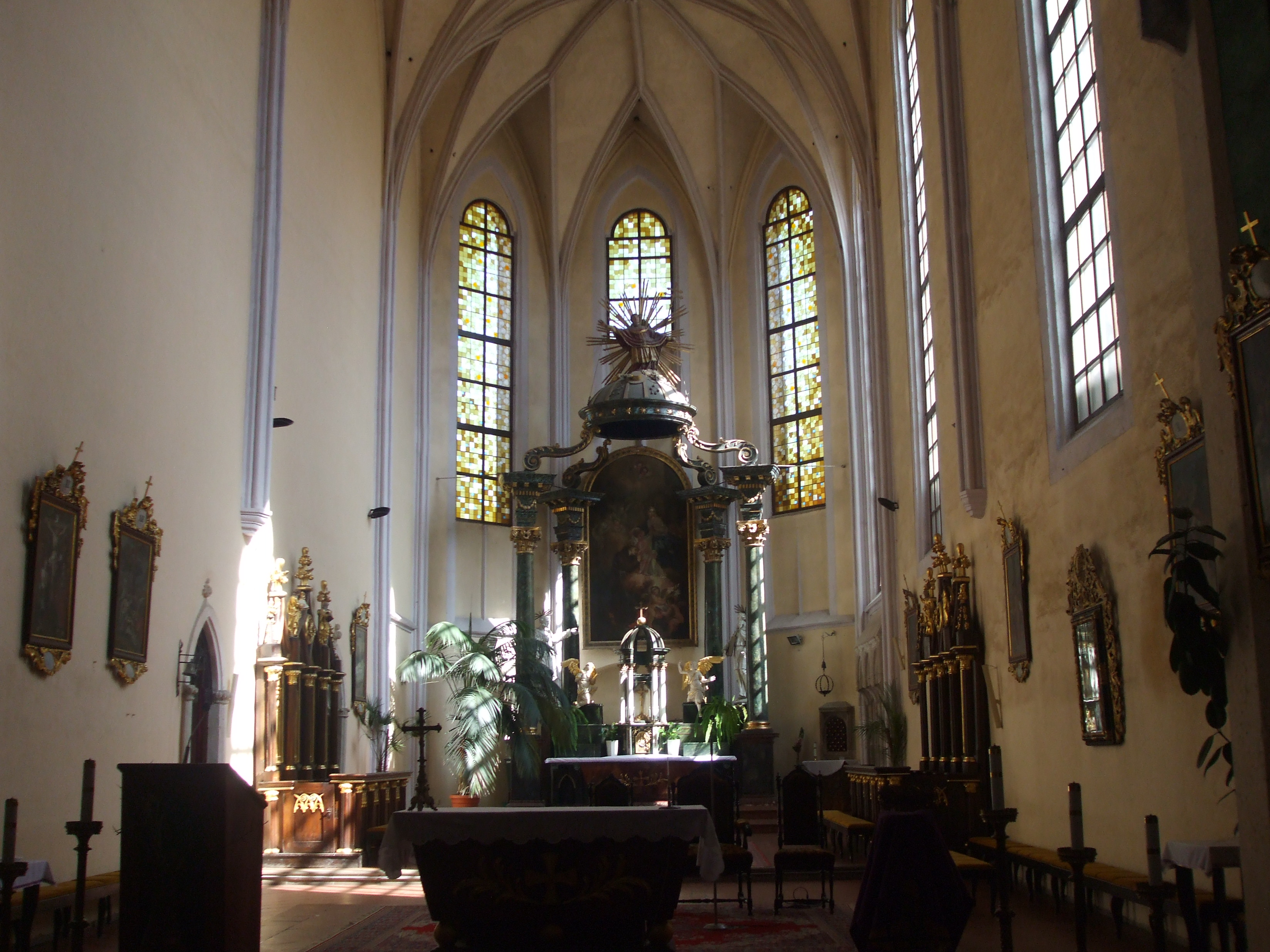
Interior

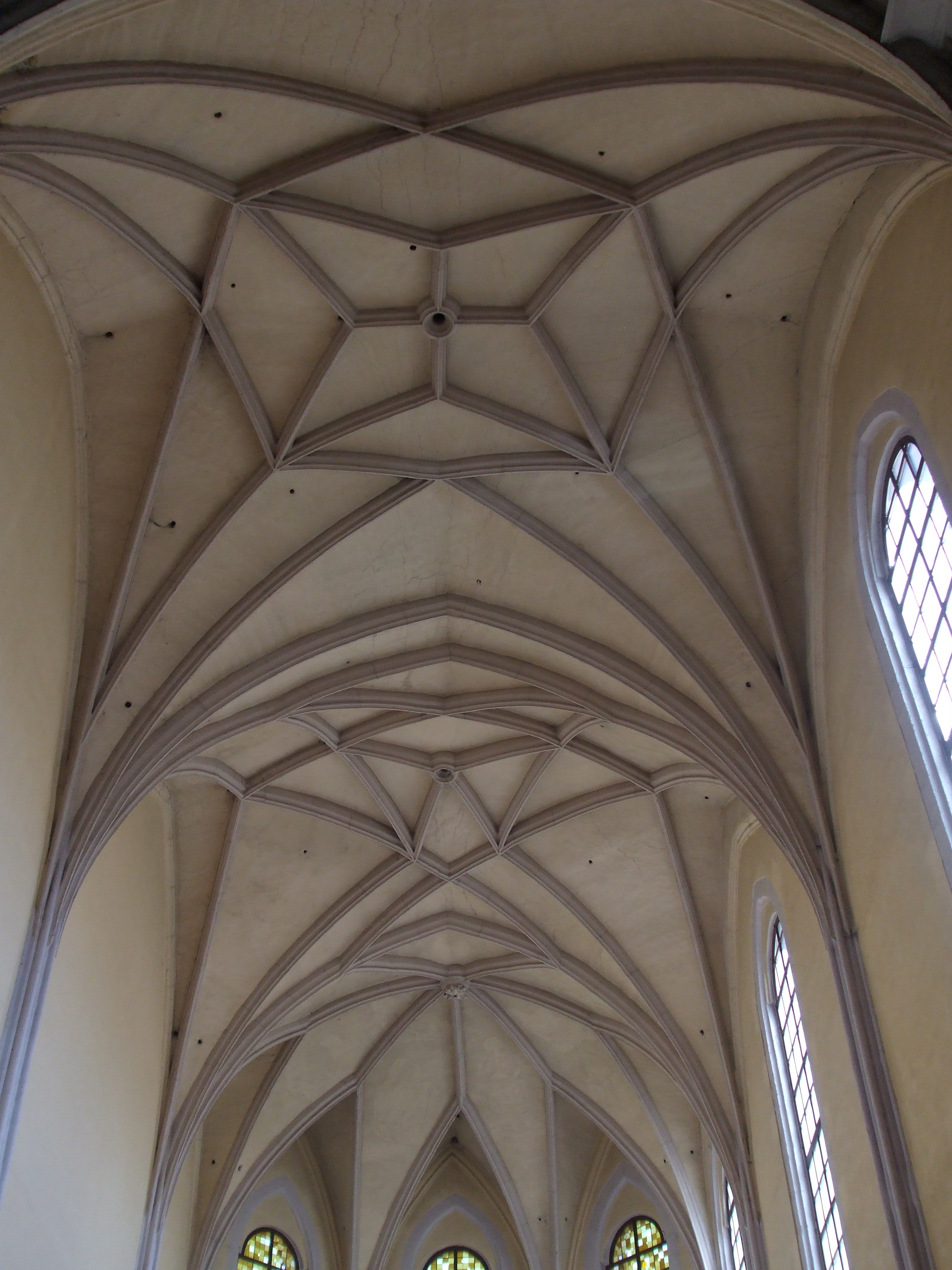
Ceiling

== See also ==
- Košice
- Archdiocese of Košice
- St Charles Borromeo Seminary in Košice
