= Andrew (bishop of Eger) =

13th-14th-century Hungarian Catholic bishop

- Bishop of Eger
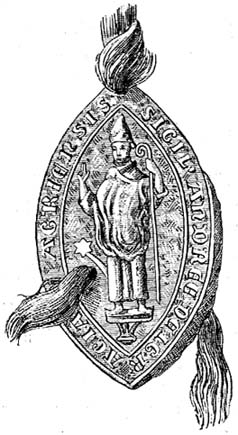
- Seal of Andrew, 1292
- See: Eger
- Appointed: 1275
- Term ended: 1305
- Predecessor: Lampert Hont-Pázmány
- Successor: Martin
- Other post: Chancellor of the Queen

Personal details
- Died: 1305 or 1306

Andrew (Hungarian: András; died 1305 or 1306) was a Hungarian prelate at the turn of the 13th and 14th centuries, who served as Bishop of Eger from 1275 until his death.

== Ecclesiastical affairs ==
Andrew's origin and early career is unknown. His name first appeared in contemporary records on 3 April 1275, when he was already referred to as Bishop-elect of Eger, succeeding Lampert Hont-Pázmány, who died in that year. Shortly thereafter, his election was confirmed by Pope Gregory X sometime before 21 May 1275, when Andrew was already styled as simply "bishop". After his election, Andrew made a promise to recover the privileges and revenues of the cathedral chapter of Eger, which were confiscated by his predecessor Lampert. It included the recovery of grain and wine tithes throughout the diocese, the unlawfully usurped properties of the canons in the town of Eger, in addition to several villages in Northeast Hungary, which belonged to the cathedral chapter prior to that. He also restored the chapter's right to hold a weekly market on Tuesdays.

Despite that reconciliation, Andrew, like his predecessors, also had some conflicts with the local chapter. After a meeting with the delegation of the burghers of Kassa (present-day Košice, Slovakia) in 1290, Andrew exempted the parish of Kassa from the jurisdiction of the archdeacon of Újvár and placed it directly under the authority of him, because of their complaint against the archdeacon, who in disputed situations often reached for the punishment of interdict, and demanded 1-1 marks for his work of absolution after every violent death in the town. Andrew also supported the efforts of the parish church of Kassa against the cathedral chapter during a lawsuit in 1292. The bishop mediated between Arnold, the parson of Kassa and the Eger Chapter during their agreement over the tithes in the town, which Andrew formulated and confirmed in his charter in 1297. According to a later complaint, Andrew unilaterally increased the number of canons to 30, filling new seats with his own supporters, which, however, undermined the livelihood of the canons.

Andrew sought to increase and concentrate the estates of his bishopric surrounding to the town of Eger. He exchanged the villages of Timár in Szabolcs County and Oszlár in Borsod County with the namesake son of Alexander Karászi, Ban of Severin in 1276 for his three lands – Bakta, Buda and Tárkány –, which laid in the neighborhood of Eger. For the same reason, Andrew exchanged the village of Szurdokpüspöki for Noha (laid on the border of Heves and Borsod counties) with comes Mihedeus Káta in 1288, and the land of Bátony for Bátor with Pous Baksa in 1295. Another noble, the childless Emeric Örsi bequeathed the estate of Tiszaörs and the local St. John the Evangelist church to the Diocese of Eger in his last will and testament of 1292. Andrew also supported the monastic communities in his diocese. The prior of the Paulines, Lawrence, requested Andrew to confirm their rule (regula) in 1297.

Over the decades, Andrew had a harsh dispute with Peter Monoszló, the Bishop of Transylvania. The main source of the conflict was the issue of jurisdiction over the sparsely populated Máramaros region (today Maramureș in Romania). Since the rule of Andrew II of Hungary, it, alongside Ugocsa and Bereg, belonged to the Diocese of Eger, later confirmed by both Béla IV and Stephen V. In the early 13th century, Máramaros was mostly part of Sásvár ispánate. In 1230, the Archdeaconry of Sásvár was already under the ecclesiastical administration of the Diocese of Transylvania. In 1288, Ladislaus IV gave the right to collect tithe to Peter Monoszló, at the same time with the church taxes in Ugocsa County. When Máramaros County emerged in the territory following large-scale resettlements, increasing its significance, Andrew has claimed jurisdiction over the region. This emerged ito a large-scale conflict by early 1299, when King Andrew III granted the jurisdiction over Máramaros to the Diocese of Eger. After Peter Monoszló's protest and pressure, the monarch changed his intention, withdrawing the decision, and handed over the matter to the competence of their metropolitan, John Hont-Pázmány, Archbishop of Kalocsa in February 1299. As Andrew refused to attend a hearing at the archbishopric chancellery and Emeric, Bishop of Várad conducted on-site inspections among the local noblemen, who mostly supported Peter, King Andrew III decided to donate Máramaros to the Diocese of Transylvania. In response, Bishop Andrew has launched a new lawsuit in 1300 before the royal court, while Peter initiated an investigation to the Holy See, arguing with the unauthorized nature of the secular courts. Peter also complained about that Bishop Andrew dedicated "unduly" churches and cemeteries in Máramaros even in 1299. The outcome of the lawsuit can not be reconstructed because of the lack of sources, however a few decades later, Máramaros belonged to the Diocese of Eger according to the papal tithe registers.

== Involvement in national politics ==
Andrew's episcopal activity of thee decades coincided with one of the most chaotic periods of the medieval Kingdom of Hungary, the so-called era of "feudal anarchy". The territory of the Diocese of Eger was the scene of various oligarchic endeavors as powerful families tried to build their domain independent of the king. After Ladislaus IV was declared to be of legal age in 1277, the monarch intended to eliminate the Geregyes' power, who ruled the territory through from Szepesség (Spiš) to Transylvania via Nyírség. Ladislaus launched a military campaign against them at the turn of 1277 and 1278. The royal troops also pillaged, devastated and confiscated the episcopal villages which laid in Eger valley, and many local residents were interned to Szihalom in the spring of 1278. The attack was retaliatory because Ladislaus assumed the bishop cooperated with the Geregyes and supported their aspiration. In late 1278, Pope Nicholas III sent Philip, Bishop of Fermo, to Hungary to help Ladislaus IV restore royal power and to arrange a number of Church irregularities in Hungary. The papal legate arrived in the kingdom in early 1279. Philip soon realized, that most Cumans (the king's favorite subjects) were still pagans in Hungary. The national deat, thereafter, adopted the so-called Cuman laws and also authorized John Hont-Pázmány and four other bishops – including Andrew –, whose dioceses were inhabited by a significant number of Cuman tribes, to visit and baptize the Cumans, to liberate Hungarian prisoners and to examine the noble lands surrounded by the tribes. The policy of the papal legate, who had no regard for local political conditions, forced the Hungarian prelates to decide between the Hungarian monarch and the Roman Curia. Following that the papal legate convened a synod in Buda on 14 September 1279, where Andrew also attended. In May 1280, Andrew was mandated by Philip of Fermo to hand over the pallium to Archbishop Lodomer.

After Bishop Philip of Fermo left Hungary in the summer of 1281, Ladislaus IV attempted to restore political consolidation and reconcile with the Hungarian bishops. On his way to his military expedition against the strongholds of the rebellious lord Finta Aba in the summer of 1281, the monarch visited the Diocese of Eger, when he negotiated with Andrew. Three years later, Ladislaus returned four settlements – Bökény, Csépes, Kacsád and Recsk – to the chapter and also confirmed the bishop's right of ownership over the previously pillaged episcopal villages in Eger valley in June and September 1284, respectively. In the same time, the king also transcribed and confirmed the charter of his late father Stephen V from 1271, which guaranteed the rights and privileges of the diocese. The king also provided the right of hold weekly fairs on every Thursdays to the episcopal village of Szikszó. The territory of the diocese was heavily affected by the second Mongol invasion of Hungary at the turn of 1285 and 1286. Fierce fighting occurred in Újvár and Sáros counties, but local nobles soon expelled the invaders from the area.

By the late 1280s, the territory of the diocese fell within the sphere of interest of some local powerful lords, who established their oligarchic dominions around that time. Stephen Ákos and his clan, who acquired large-scale landholdings in Borsod County, arbitrarily usurped the village of Cserép from the diocese for decades. Andrew complaint to the royal court in 1296 that Stephen Ákos had unlawfully seized the bishopric's two estates – Cserép and Kisgyőr –, therefore the monarch Andrew III permitted him to launch a lawsuit in any court. Around the same time, Amadeus Aba – who had important role in the victory over the Mongols – ruled de facto independently the northern and north-eastern counties of the kingdom, which also covered the overwhelming majority of the bishopric of Eger. Andrew maintained a good and cooperative relationship with Amadeus Aba during the second half of his episcopal tenure; the lord also supported the church financially in his oligarchic domain. Bishop Andrew supported the political orientation of King Andrew III, who ascended the Hungarian throne in 1290. Upon the request of Archbishop Lodomer and two local bishops, Andrew of Eger and Paschasius of Nyitra (Nitra), the newly crowned monarch confirmed Amadeus Aba in his all revenues in Ung County along with his positions in November 1290. Bishop Andrew was styled as the chancellor of the royal consort, Queen Fenenna of Kuyavia in July 1291. It is possible he held the dignity for a brief time only, substituting Benedict Rád temporarily for some reasons. In the 1290s, Archbishop Lodomer and the entire Church episcopal hierarchy were considered the strongest pillars of King Andrew's reign until his death and the extinction of the Árpád dynasty in 1301.

Following the death of Andrew III, a war of succession for the Hungarian throne broke out between Charles of Anjou and Wenceslaus of Přemyslid. Along with the overwhelming majority of the Hungarian prelates, Andrew supported the claim of the Bohemian prince. He was member of that diplomatic mission led by Archbishop John Hont-Pázmány, along with several bishops and barons, who met Wenceslaus II in Hodonín in August 1301, where the king accepted their offer in his eleven-year-old son's name. Andrew was present at the coronation of Wenceslaus in Székesfehérvár on 27 August 1301. In the upcoming years (1302–1303), the prelates – plausibly including Andrew – switched their support from Wenceslaus to Charles of Anjou, whose candidacy was also supported by the Holy See. The local powerful lord, Amadeus Aba was considered one of the strongest domestic partisans of the Neapolitan pretender too, who also resided in his territory (i.e. also the diocese of Eger) in the period between 1304 and 1306. By that time, the elderly Andrew retired from national affairs. He was last mentioned as a living person in 1305. He died in still that year or early 1306, when his successor Martin was elected Bishop of Eger.

== Sources ==
- Barabás, Gábor (2023). Delegated Papal Jurisdiction in Arpadian Hungary. Bishops – provosts – papal chaplains. Arpadiana XVI., Research Centre for the Humanities. ISBN 978-963-416-405-0.
- Engel, Pál (1996). Magyarország világi archontológiája, 1301–1457, I. [Secular Archontology of Hungary, 1301–1457, Volume I] (in Hungarian). História, MTA Történettudományi Intézete. ISBN 963-8312-44-0.
- Farkas, Csaba (2020). "Viszály Egerben: Márton püspök és az egri káptalan konfliktusa [Feud in Eger: The Conflict between Bishop Martin and the Eger Chapter]". In Thoroczkay, Gábor (ed.). Püspökök, káptalanok, tizedek: Tanulmányok (in Hungarian). Kronosz Kiadó. pp. 201–220. ISBN 978-615-6048-57-8.
- Sugár, István (1984). Az egri püspökök története [The History of the Bishops of Eger] (in Hungarian). Szent István Társulat. ISBN 963-360-392-7.
- Zsoldos, Attila (2011). Magyarország világi archontológiája, 1000–1301 [Secular Archontology of Hungary, 1000–1301] (in Hungarian). História, MTA Történettudományi Intézete. ISBN 978-963-9627-38-3.

Catholic Church titles
Preceded by Lampert Hont-Pázmány	Bishop of Eger; 1275–1305	Succeeded by Martin
Political offices
Preceded by Benedict Rád	Chancellor of the Queen; 1291	Succeeded by Benedict Rád
