= St. Charles Seminary (disambiguation) =

St. Charles Seminary may refer to:

- St. Charles Seminary, former American Catholic seminary in Carthagena, Ohio, United States
- St. Charles Borromeo Seminary, Roman Catholic seminary in Wynnewood, Pennsylvania, United States
- St Charles Borromeo Seminary, Roman Catholic Major Seminary in Košice, Slovakia
