= Kata Szidónia Petrőczy =

Hungarian writer and poet

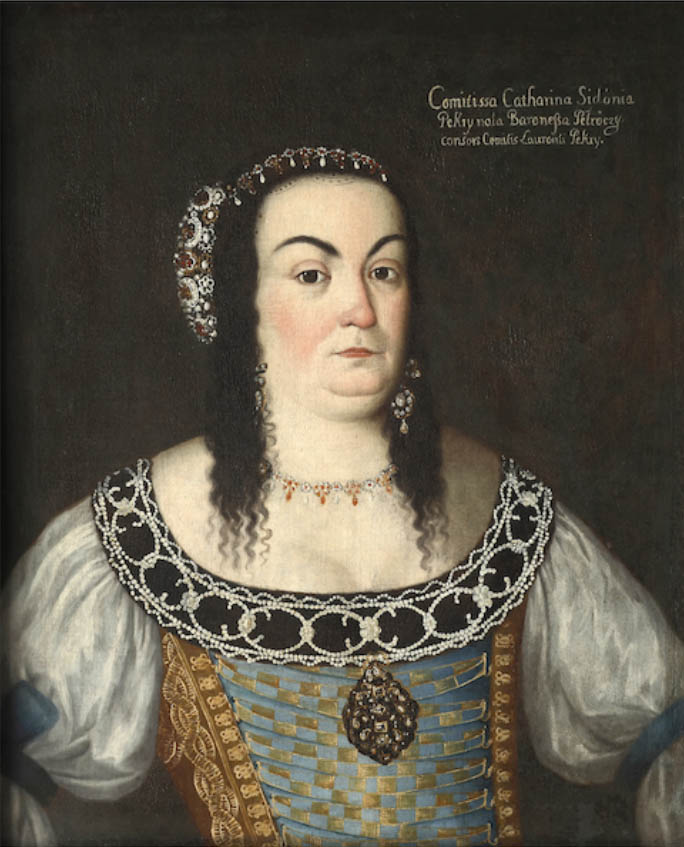
Kata Szidónia Petrőczy

Kata Szidónia Petrőczy (1658–21 October 1708) was a Hungarian writer and poet. She is regarded as the first female writer of the Baroque period in Hungary and its foremost representative of Baroque prose.

Kata Szidónia was the daughter of baron Stephen Petrőczy and Elisabeth Thököly and cousin of prince Imre Thököly of Transylvania. Her family was Protestant. After her father participated in 1670 in a rebellion against Habsburg, they lived in exile in Poland for a while. She married Petrovinai Pekry Lőrinc in 1681, and became the grandmother of writer Polixénia Daniel (1720–1776). The couple were deeply involved in the political life of Hungary and Transylvania. Her poems were published in 1874.
