= Diocese of Debrecen–Nyíregyháza =

Roman Catholic diocese in Hungary

Diocese of Debrecen–Nyíregyháza Dioecesis Debrecenensis–Nyiregyhazanus Debrecen-Nyíregyházi egyházmegye

Catholic
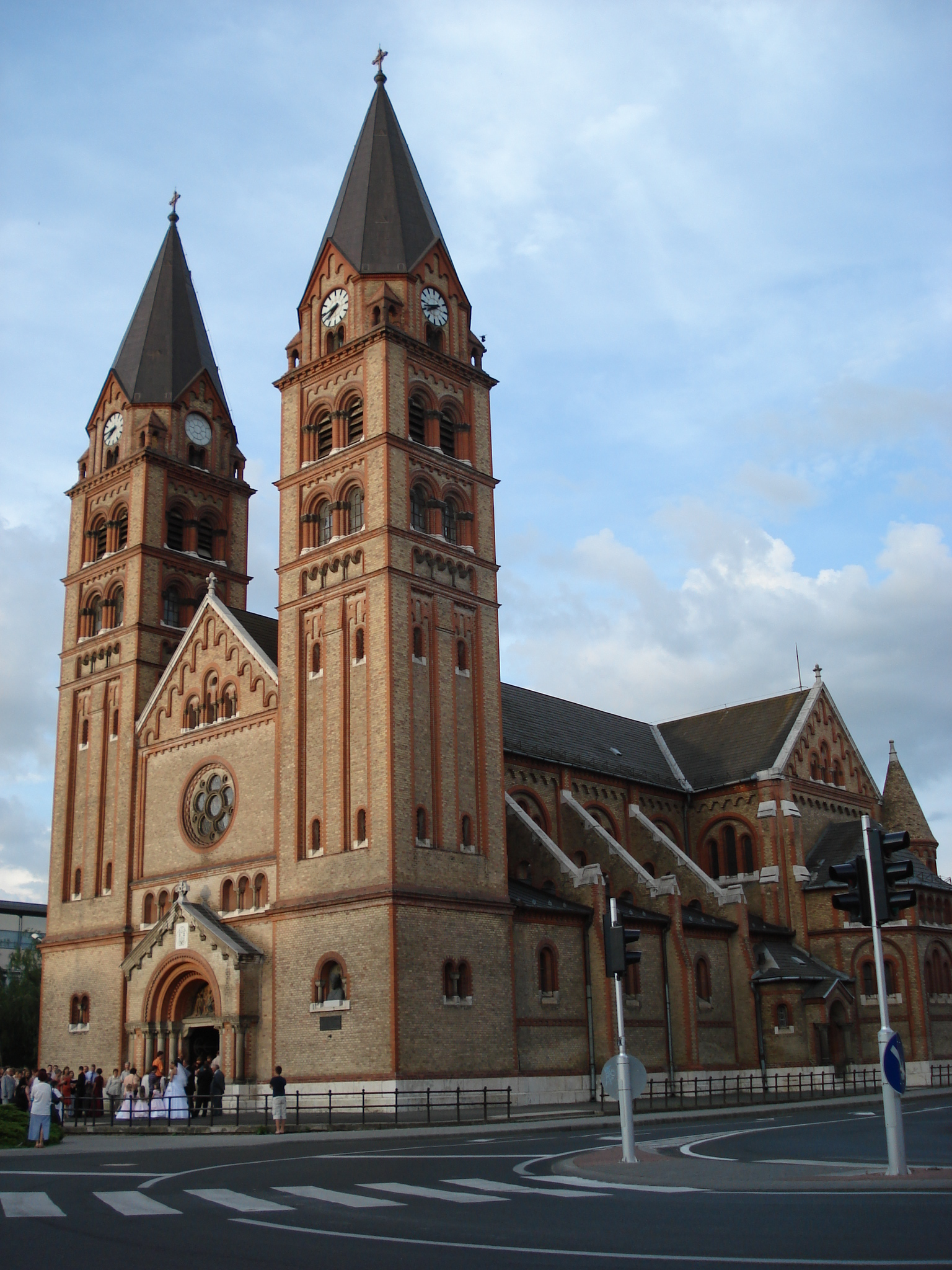
- Co-Cathedral of Nyíregyháza

Location
- Country: Hungary
- Ecclesiastical province: Eger
- Metropolitan: Eger
- Headquarters: Debrecen
- Coordinates: 47°31′34″N 21°37′47″E

Statistics
- Area: 11,300 km^{2} (4,400 sq mi)
- Population: Total; Catholics: (as of 2011); 1,137,000; 250,000 (22%)

Information
- Rite: Latin Rite
- Established: May 31, 1993
- Cathedral: Cathedral of St Anne in Debrecen
- Co-cathedral: Co-Cathedral of Our Lady of the Hungarians in Nyíregyháza

Current leadership
- Pope: Leo XIV
- Bishop: Ferenc Palanki
- Metropolitan Archbishop: Csaba Ternyák

Map
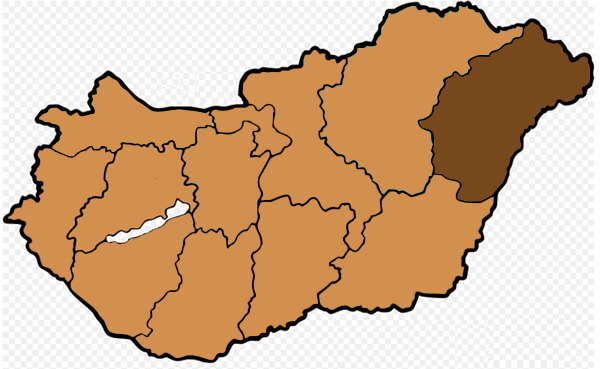
- Map of the Diocese

Website
- www.dnyem.hu

The Diocese of Debrecen–Nyíregyháza (Latin: Dioecesis Debrecenensis–Nyiregyhazanus) is a Latin Church diocese of the Catholic Church located in the cities of Debrecen and Nyíregyháza in the ecclesiastical province of Eger in Hungary.

== History ==
- 31 May 1993: Established as Diocese of Debrecen – Nyíregyháza from the Metropolitan Archdiocese of Eger and Diocese of Szeged–Csanád

== Leadership ==
- Bishops of Debrecen–Nyíregyháza (Roman rite)
  - Bishop Nándor Bosák (31 May 1993 – 21 September 2015)
  - Bishop Ferenc Palánki (21 September 2015 – present)

== See also ==
- Roman Catholicism in Hungary
- List of Roman Catholic dioceses in Hungary

== Sources ==
- GCatholic.org
- Catholic Hierarchy
