= Polixénia Daniel =

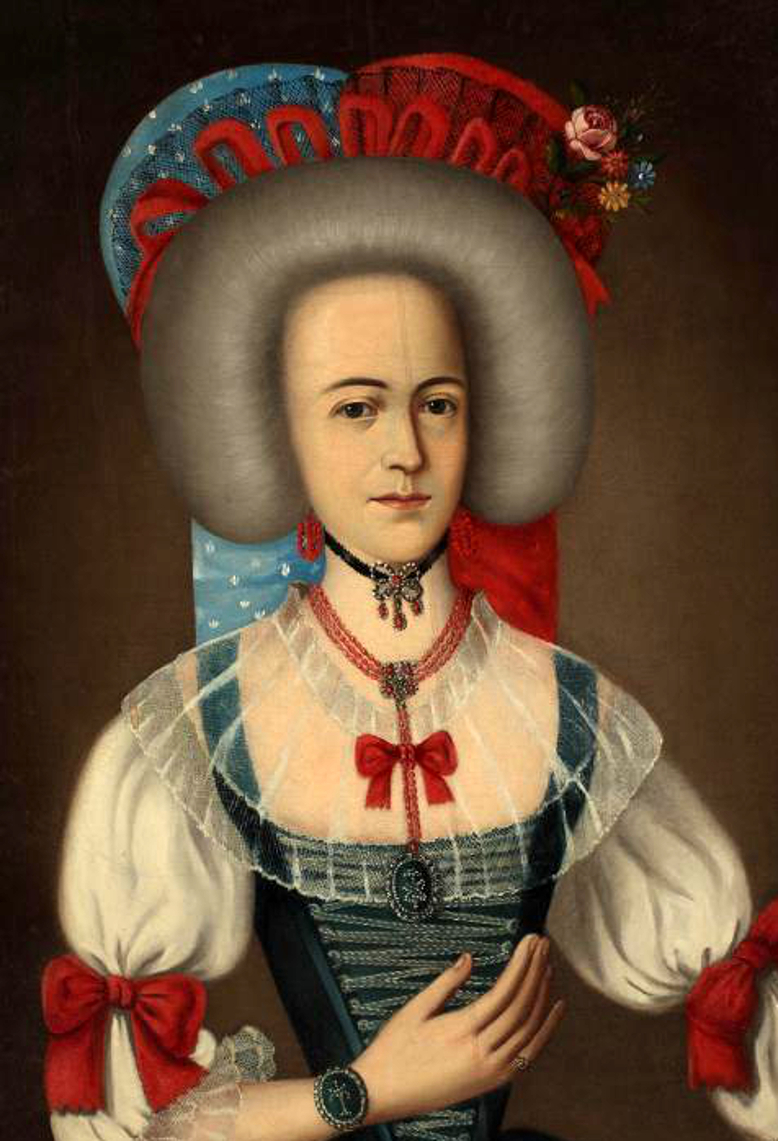
- Born: 14 January 1720; Szászvessződ
- Died: 24 September 1775 (aged 55); Zsibó
- Spouse: Wesselényi István (1708–1757)

Polixénia Daniel (1720–1775), was a Hungarian noble, philanthropist and writer.

She was the daughter of baron Daniel Stephen and married baron Wesselényi István in 1742. She became known for her great learning, her charitable projects and as a protector of artists and scientists. She was also active as a writer, and several manuscripts of her hand survives. Her daughter, Zsuzsanna Wesselényi (1744–1800), became known for her diary.
