= Timár =

Coordinates: 48°10′N 21°28′E

- Coat of arms
- Interactive map of Timár
- Country: Hungary
- County: Szabolcs-Szatmár-Bereg

Area
  - Total: 21.82 km^{2} (8.42 sq mi)

Population (2015)
  - Total: 1,293
  - Density: 59.3/km^{2} (154/sq mi)
- Time zone: UTC+1 (CET)
  - Summer (DST): UTC+2 (CEST)
- Postal code: 4466
- Area code: 42
- Website: timar.hu

Location of Szabolcs-Szatmar-Bereg county in Hungary

Timár is a village in Szabolcs-Szatmár-Bereg county, in the Northern Great Plain region of eastern Hungary.

== Geography ==
It covers an area of 21.82 km^{2} (8 sq mi) and has a population of 1293 people (2015).

== History ==
As early as 1067, the name of the settlement was mentioned in a charter belonging to the castle of Szabolcs and the residence of the tanners serving the castle. his name was still written in the form of Vense at that time. His later name certainly comes from the tannery occupation of its former inhabitants.

The village was probably destroyed during the Tartar invasion because in 1245 it was only called a wilderness. After the Tartar invasion, King Bela gave it to Stephen of the Gutkeled family. In 1347 his landlords were the Báthorians, then the Transylvanian prince István Bethlen, later the Rákóczians, II. György Rákóczi and II. It became the property of Ferenc Rákóczi, until the peace of Szatmár, and was part of the Ecsedi estate.

After the Peace of Satu Mare, it became the treasury, which in the late 1700s populated the village, which had been essentially destroyed again, with Roman Catholic and Greek Catholic Ruthenian settlers.

In a large fire in 1800, the village was almost completely burned down but was soon rebuilt.

The settlement remained the property of the treasury until 1848, when the serfs were liberated.

Among its old place names it was recorded at the beginning of the 20th century: Luka-Back, Péterke-side, Godolya, Aranyos, Sváb-út, Csorka, Megyesi-dűlő, Dányi dülő, Bika meadow, Butyka shore, Miadon shore, Mogyorós, Great lake, Kistisza, Owl Nail and Iron Gate sand names.

It was a settlement that melted on the border of Tímár and has now disappeared: Erkete (Erekcse), which is mentioned in a 15th century charter as a settlement adjacent to Tímár, but the Dl. His charter of 1367 also mentions a settlement called Vécse as a neighbor of Tímár.
