= Benedict Kisdy =

Hungarian Roman Catholic bishop

- Bishop of Eger
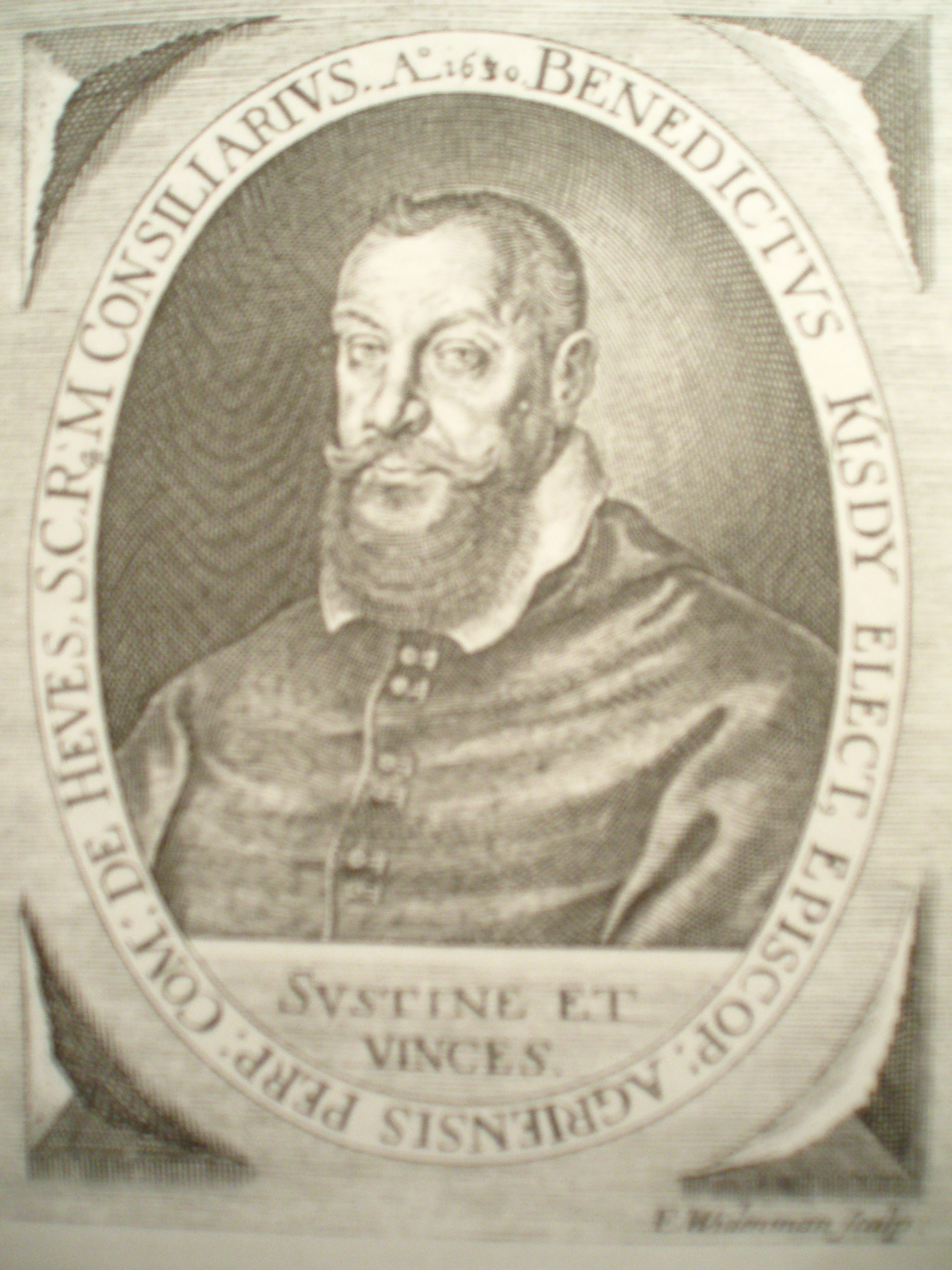
- Church: Catholic Church
- Diocese: Diocese of Eger
- In office: 8 April 1652 – 22 June 1660
- Predecessor: György Jakusics
- Successor: Tamás Pálffy

Personal details
- Born: 1598 Seçen, Budin Eyalet, Ottoman Empire
- Died: 22 June 1660 (aged 61–62)

Benedict Kisdy (Hungarian: Kisdy Benedek, Slovak: Benedikt Kišdy) (c. 1598 – 22 June 1660) was a Hungarian Roman Catholic bishop in the 17th century. He was the founder of the Royal University (Universitas Cassoviensis) in present-day Košice and the Bishop of Eger.

== Biography ==
From 1596 to 1700, Kassa, Kingdom of Hungary (today: Košice, Slovakia) was the seat of the bishops of Eger. It was during this time, from 1648 until 1660, that Benedict was bishop.

On 26 February 1657, he founded an academy in Kassa, the first of its kind in the city. He went on to present it with 40,000 tallers. He placed it under the teaching administration of the Jesuits. The academy became a university with promulgation of a bull on 6 August 1660 by the Holy Roman Emperor Leopold I. In 1777, the university was removed from Jesuit administration and became a Royal University.

He is buried in the Franciscan seminary church in Kassa.

== Legacy ==
On 6 April 1979, Pope John Paul II made an address to a group of Hungarian bishops, priests and congregation members. At the start of the speech he mentioned the work of the Hungarian College and the alumni of that college, stating, "I do not want to pass over in silence the figure of Benedict Kisdy, whose admirable hymns still ring out in your churches."

== Gallery ==
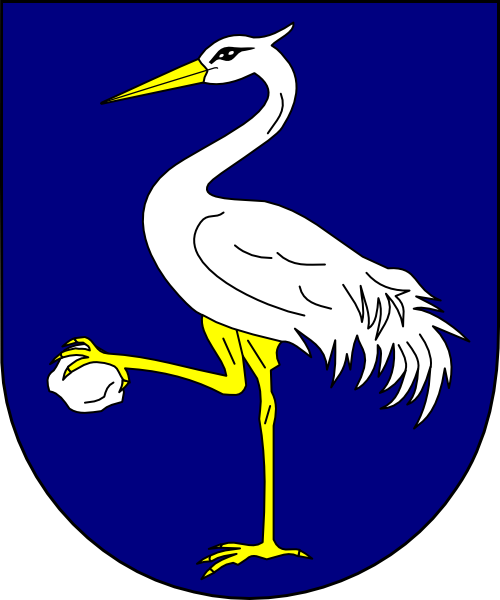
His coat of arms, based on the relief on the altar in the Franciscan church in Košice

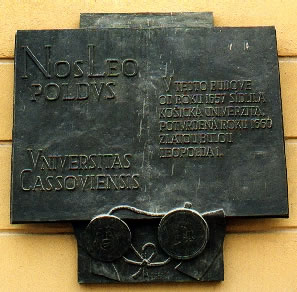
Bull by Leopold I on the status of the University of Košice

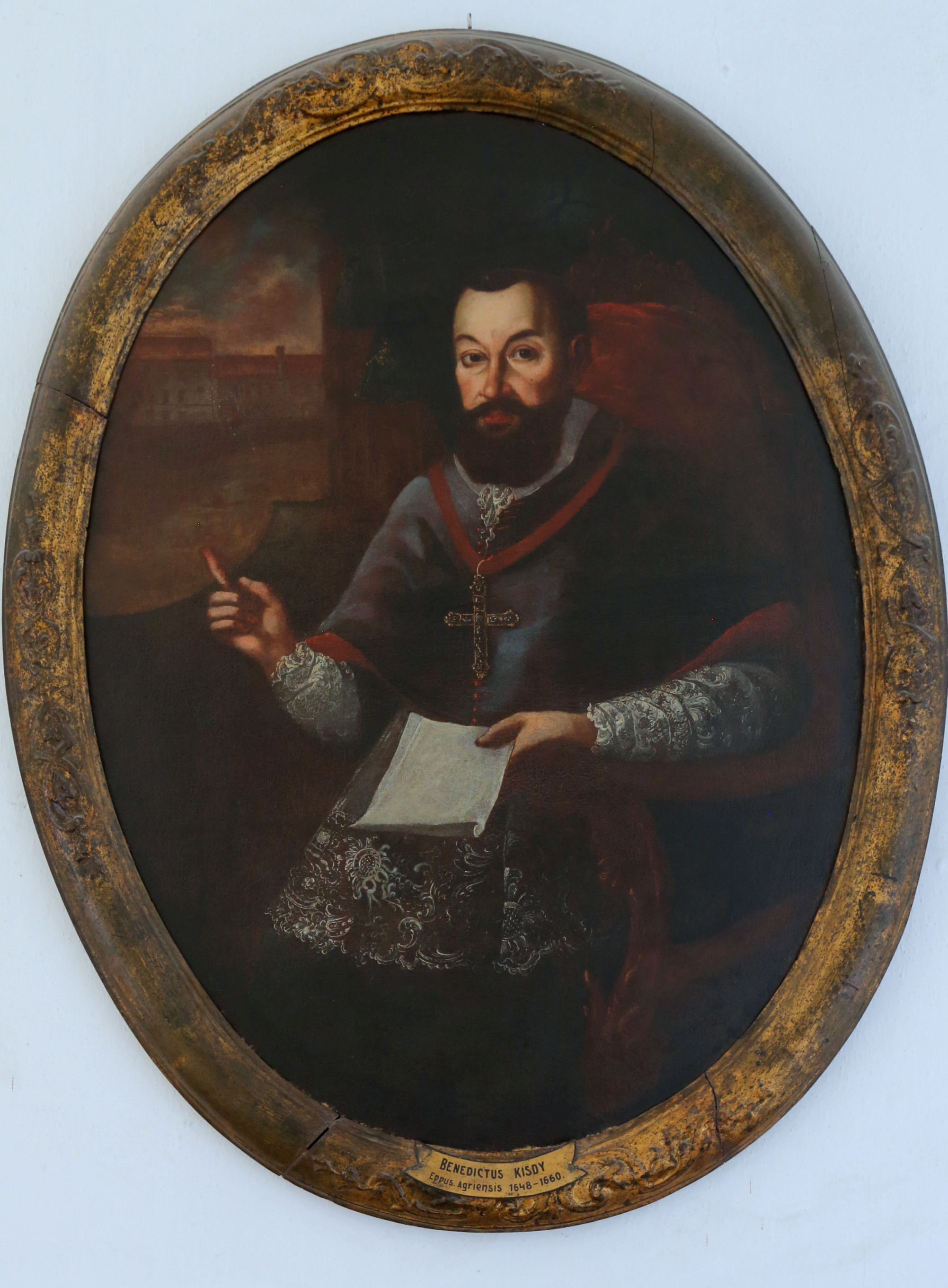
Portrait

== See also ==
- Church of the Holy Trinity, Košice
