= Lampert Hont-Pázmány (bishop) =

Hungarian prelate

- Bishop of Eger
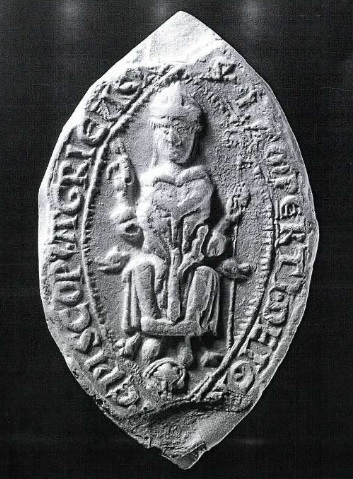
- Seal of Lampert Hont-Pázmány (1271)
- Appointed: 1245
- Term ended: 1275
- Predecessor: Cletus Bél
- Successor: Andrew

Personal details
- Died: January/March 1275
- Parents: Nicholas Hont-Pázmány

Lampert from the kindred Hont-Pázmány (Hungarian: Hont-Pázmány nembeli Lampert; died between January and March 1275) was a Hungarian prelate in the 13th century, who served as Bishop of Eger from December 1245 to early 1275.

== Family ==
Lampert was born into the Kóvár (or Csalomja) branch of the wealthy and prestigious gens (clan) Hont-Pázmány as one of the four sons of comes Nicholas I. His brothers were Pázmány – ancestor of the Kóvári family –, Nicholas II – ancestor of the Kiscsalomjai and Valkán de Kiscsalomja families – and Zoyzlaus.

== Bishop of Eger ==
His early ecclesiastical career is unknown. Lampert was first styled as bishop-elect of Eger in December 1245, although the document did not specify his name. His predecessor Cletus Bél last appeared as a living person on 12 December, consequently Lampert was elected within weeks. By name, Lampert was first mentioned in contemporary documents in June 1247.

The Diocese of Eger was plundered and devastated by the invading Mongols in 1241–42. Lampert committed to reclaiming the lost estates and property of the diocese. Under his reign, the destroyed Eger Cathedral was renovated and rebuilt. King Béla IV of Hungary sought to strengthen the bishopric with land donations. He placed the relatively newly formed Sáros County under the jurisdiction of the Diocese of Eger in 1248. In the same year, the king returned the village of Cserép to the bishopric, which was unlawfully seized by Ernye Ákos. Lampert was also granted three villages with port duties along the river Tisza, including Csege and Örvény (present-day a borough in Tiszafüred), in addition to the Ohat Abbey in the western part of Hortobágy. Lampert was permitted to build a stone castle in Füzérkő (also known as Kerekkő), near present-day Bükkzsérc, which laid in the Bükk Mountains. The castle was erected in the following years, but it did not play a significant role in the future and presumably was demolished by the early 14th century.

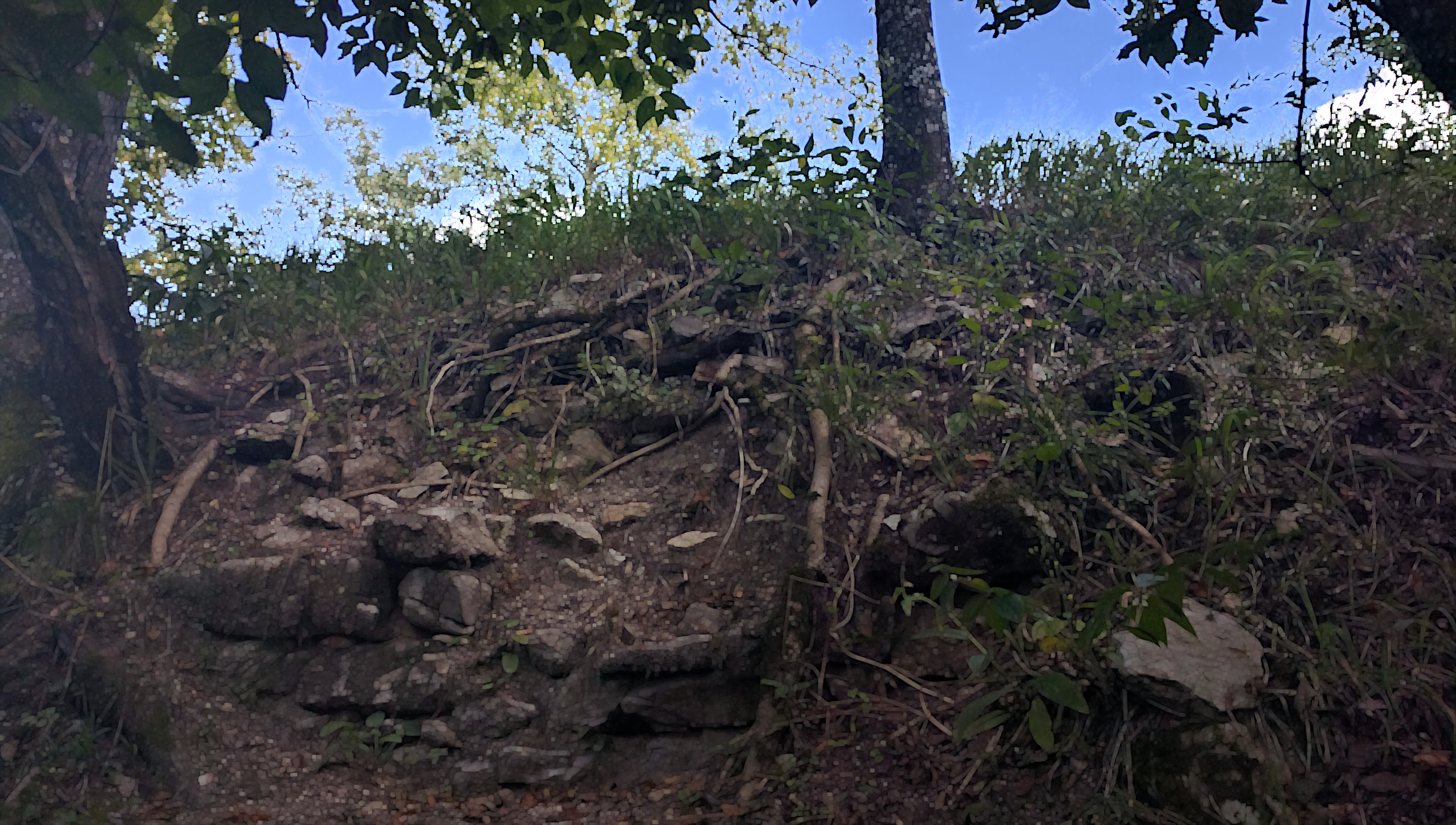
The ruins of Füzérkő Castle (near Bükkzsérc), built by Lampert Hont-Pázmány in the 1250s

King Béla IV entrusted the Knights Hospitaller to settle Cumans in the territory of the Diocese of Eger to make up for a population drastically reduced during the Mongol invasion. He notified Lampert of this decision in the late 1240s. The monarch confirmed all previously granted land donations, income, benefice, privileges for the Diocese of Eger in September 1261, upon the request of Lampert. After Béla's son, Stephen ascended the Hungarian throne, Lampert requested the monarch to transliterate and confirm his father's aforementioned privilege letter in 1271. Lampert kept himself relatively away from national political affairs. His position during the feud between Béla IV and his eldest son, Duke Stephen is unknown. He attended the national synods at Esztergom (1256) and Buda (1263). In the latter meeting, Lampert and two other bishops mediated between Philip Türje, Archbishop of Esztergom and Job Záh, Bishop of Pécs in their debate upon the order of Pope Urban IV. When Stephen V and Ottokar II of Bohemia reached an agreement in Pressburg on 2 July 1271 after their brief war, Lampert was among the signatories.

Contemporary sources confirmed that Lampert occasionally tried to extend his diocese's influence to the detriment of neighboring or privileged ecclesiastical institutions. He was usually charged with act of domination (factum potentiale) against churches. For instance, he did not recognize the autonomy of the Bélháromkút Abbey (today Bélapátfalva), built by his predecessor Cletus Bél in 1232. As a result, the Cistercian friars petitioned to the Roman Curia and Pope Innocent IV confirmed their privileges and possessions in 1253. Lampert and his cathedral chapter also declared the church of St. James in Sáros (present-day Veľký Šariš, Slovakia) with its accessory settlements as parish in 1262, and removed it from the jurisdiction of the archdeacon of Újvár to place it under the bishop's direct jurisdiction. In order to gain the support of Béla IV, the patron of the church, Lampert appointed Hippolytus, the chaplain of the king's daughter-in-law, Duchess Elizabeth as vicar of the St. James church. Stephen V's son and successor Ladislaus IV described Lampert as "tyrannical man" in 1273. Around the same time, the episcopal troops unlawfully stormed and seized the parish church of the Premonstratensian provostship of Hatvan. Lampert persuaded the friars to hand over their tithe associated with viticulture to the diocese despite their privilege, which was provided by Pope Clement IV years earlier. The army confiscated the papal bull from the monks. The provost petitioned to the royal court. In response, Ladislaus IV sent a chaplain to Eger to investigate the case, but Lampert refused to return the papal bull. Ladislaus IV complained against the bishop in his letter to Pope Gregory X. Lampert also asserted his strength against his own chapter. For instance, he confiscated houses and properties in Eger from twelve members of the cathedral chapter for some reasons.

After a 29-year episcopal activity, Lampert Hont-Pázmány died sometime between 29 January (his last mention) and March 1275. His successor Andrew was already referred to as bishop-elect on 3 April 1275.

== Sources ==
- Sugár, István (1984). Az egri püspökök története [The History of the Bishops of Eger] (in Hungarian). Szent István Társulat. ISBN 963-360-392-7.
- Zsoldos, Attila (2011). Magyarország világi archontológiája, 1000–1301 [Secular Archontology of Hungary, 1000–1301] (in Hungarian). História, MTA Történettudományi Intézete. ISBN 978-963-9627-38-3.

Lampert Genus Hont-Pázmány Born: ? Died: January/March 1275
Catholic Church titles
Preceded by Cletus Bél	Bishop of Eger; 1245–1275	Succeeded by Andrew
