= Smrečany =

- Municipality
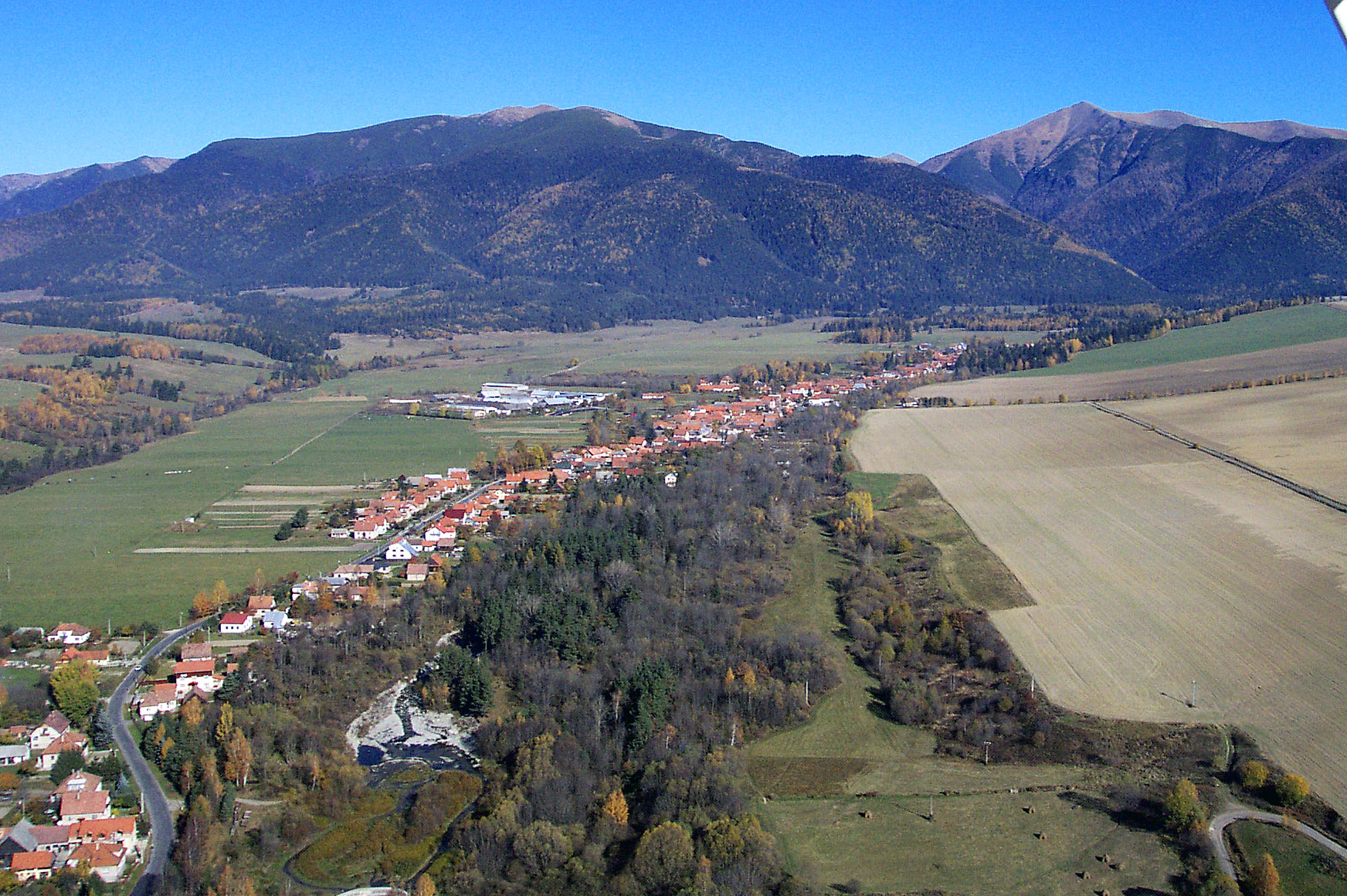

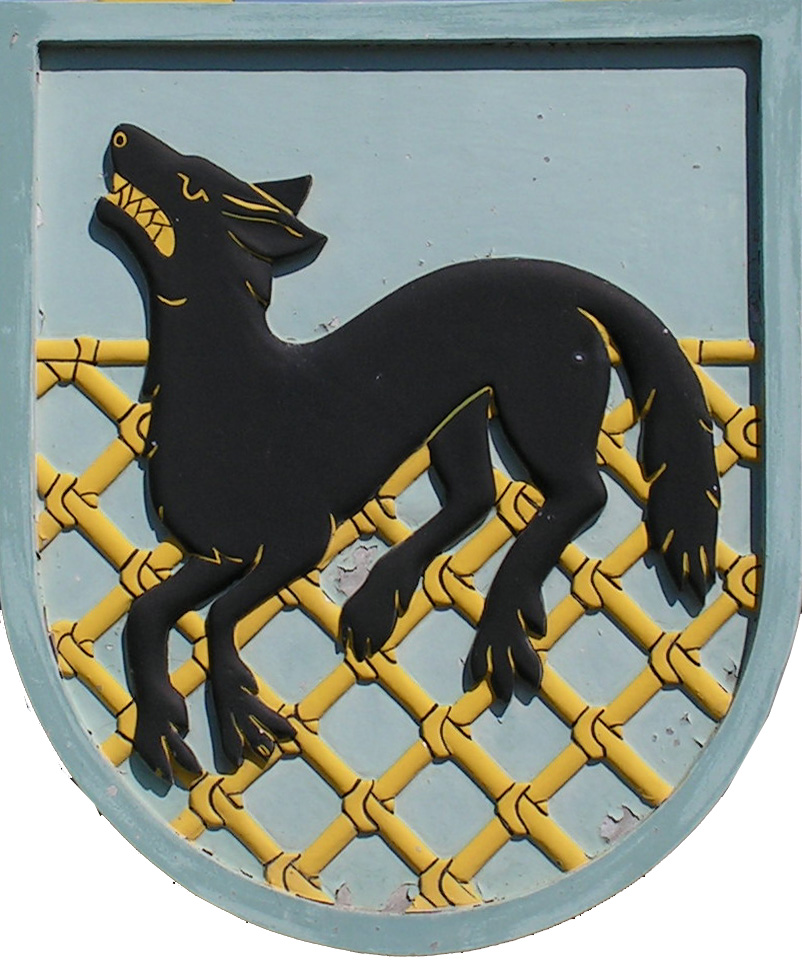
- Flag Coat of arms

- Location of Smrečany in the Žilina Region Location of Smrečany in Slovakia
- Coordinates: 49.12°N 19.65°E
- Country: Slovakia
- Region: Žilina Region
- District: Liptovský Mikuláš District
- First mentioned: 1272

Area
  - Total: 8.04 km^{2} (3.10 sq mi)
- Elevation: 701 m (2,300 ft)

Population (2025)
  - Total: 698
- Time zone: UTC+1 (CET)
  - Summer (DST): UTC+2 (CEST)
- Postal code: 310 5
- Area code: +421 44
- Vehicle registration plate (until 2022): LM
- Website: www.smrecany.sk

Smrečany (Hungarian: Szmrecsán) is a village and municipality in Liptovský Mikuláš District in the Žilina Region of northern Slovakia.

== History ==
In historical records the village was first mentioned in 1272. Before the establishment of independent Czechoslovakia in 1918, it was part of Liptó County within the Kingdom of Hungary. From 1939 to 1945, it was part of the Slovak Republic.

== Geography ==
The municipality lies at an altitude of 701 metres (2,300 ft) and covers an area of 8.04 km^{2} (3.10 sq mi) (2025).

== Population ==
Population statistic (10 years)
Year	1995	2005	2015	2025
Count	600	624	613	698
Difference		+4%	−1.76%	+13.86%

Population statistic
Year	2024	2025
Count	704	698
Difference		−0.85%

It has a population of 698 people (31 December 2025).

=== Ethnicity ===
Census 2021 (1+ %)
Ethnicity	Number	Fraction
Slovak	674	96.83%
Not found out	22	3.16%
Total	696	

In year 2021 was 696 people by ethnicity 674 as Slovak, 22 as Not found out, 4 as Other, 3 as Czech, 3 as Romani, 1 as Rusyn and 1 as Hungarian.

Note on population: The difference values of population numbers in the table "Population statistic" and in the sections "Ethnicity" & "Religion" is caused by the use of various statistical methods.

=== Religion ===
Census 2021 (1+ %)
Religion	Number	Fraction
Evangelical Church	336	48.28%
None	171	24.57%
Roman Catholic Church	139	19.97%
Not found out	21	3.02%
Other and not ascertained christian church	16	2.3%
Total	696	

In year 2021 was 696 people by religion 336 from Evangelical Church, 171 from None, 139 from Roman Catholic Church, 21 from Not found out, 16 from Other and not ascertained christian church, 6 from Ad hoc movements, 4 from Baptists Church, 2 from Christian Congregations in Slovakia and 1 from Greek Catholic Church.
