= Vlachy =

Village and municipality in Slovakia

- Municipality
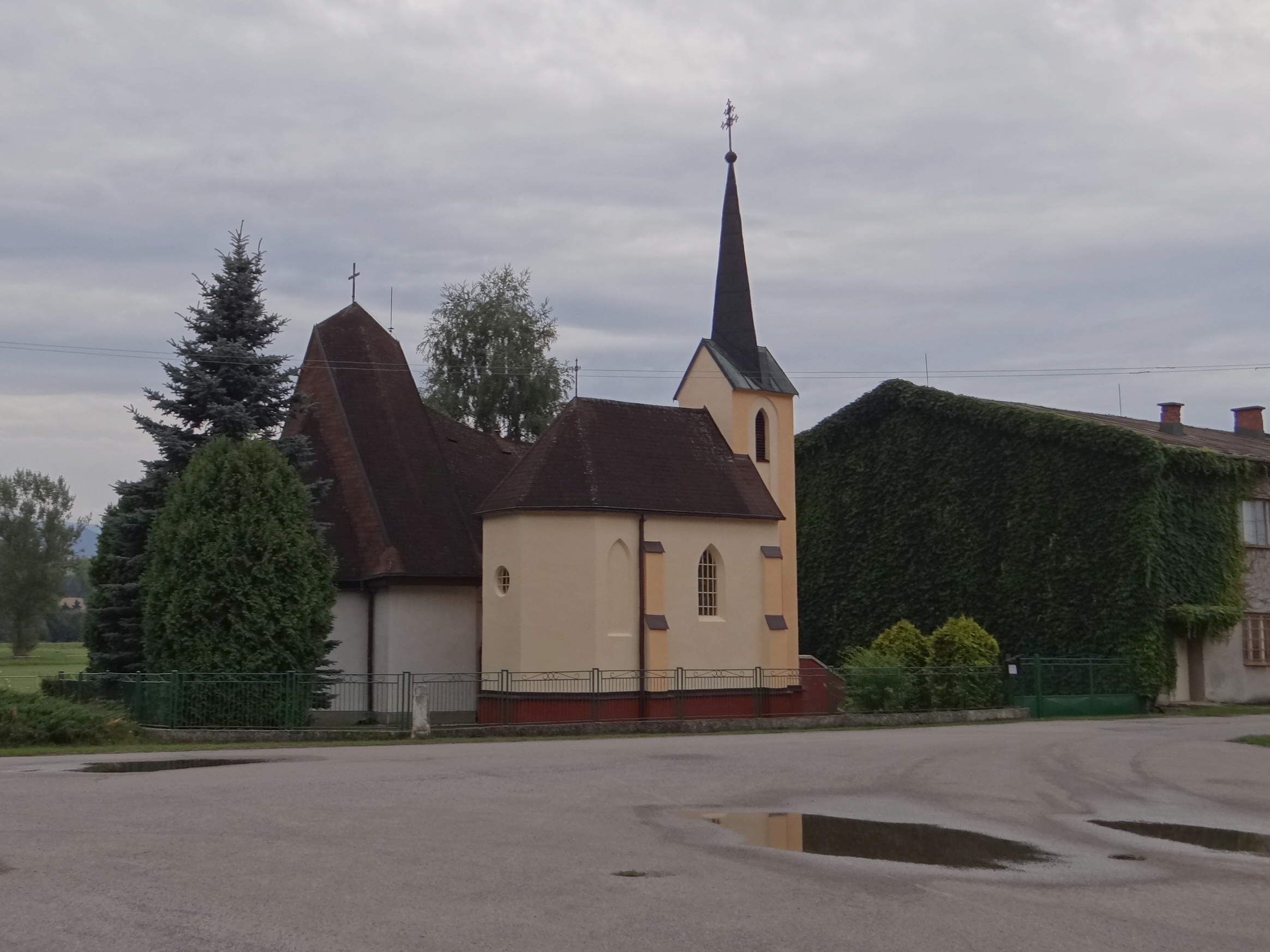

- Flag

- Location of Vlachy in the Žilina Region Location of Vlachy in Slovakia
- Coordinates: 49.08°N 19.48°E
- Country: Slovakia
- Region: Žilina Region
- District: Liptovský Mikuláš District
- First mentioned: 1262

Area
  - Total: 11.22 km^{2} (4.33 sq mi)
- Elevation: 532 m (1,745 ft)

Population (2025)
  - Total: 647
- Time zone: UTC+1 (CET)
  - Summer (DST): UTC+2 (CEST)
- Postal code: 321 3
- Area code: +421 44
- Vehicle registration plate (until 2022): LM
- Website: www.obecvlachy.sk

Vlachy (Hungarian: Nagyolaszi) is a village and municipality in Liptovský Mikuláš District in the Žilina Region of northern Slovakia.

== History ==
In historical records the village was first mentioned in 1262. Before the establishment of independent Czechoslovakia in 1918, it was part of Liptó County within the Kingdom of Hungary. From 1939 to 1945, it was part of the Slovak Republic.

== Geography ==
The municipality lies at an altitude of 532 metres (1,745 ft) and covers an area of 11.22 km^{2} (4.33 sq mi) (2025).

== Population ==
Population statistic (10 years)
Year	1995	2005	2015	2025
Count	607	630	586	647
Difference		+3.78%	−6.98%	+10.40%

Population statistic
Year	2024	2025
Count	645	647
Difference		+0.31%

It has a population of 647 people (31 December 2025).

=== Ethnicity ===
Census 2021 (1+ %)
Ethnicity	Number	Fraction
Slovak	595	96.12%
Not found out	15	2.42%
Czech	7	1.13%
Total	619	

In year 2021 was 619 people by ethnicity 595 as Slovak, 15 as Not found out, 7 as Czech, 3 as Ukrainian, 2 as Rusyn, 1 as Hungarian and 1 as Other.

Note on population: The difference values of population numbers in the table "Population statistic" and in the sections "Ethnicity" & "Religion" is caused by the use of various statistical methods.

=== Religion ===
Census 2021 (1+ %)
Religion	Number	Fraction
Roman Catholic Church	331	53.47%
None	140	22.62%
Evangelical Church	122	19.71%
Not found out	14	2.26%
Greek Catholic Church	8	1.29%
Total	619	

In year 2021 was 619 people by religion 331 from Roman Catholic Church, 140 from None, 122 from Evangelical Church, 14 from Not found out, 8 from Greek Catholic Church, 2 from United Methodist Church, 1 from Seventh-day Adventist Church and 1 from Ad hoc movements.
