= Archdiocese of Eger =

Roman Catholic archdiocese in Hungary

Coordinates: 47.8993°N 20.3732°E

Diocese of Eger Archidioecesis Agriensis Egri főegyházmegye

Catholic
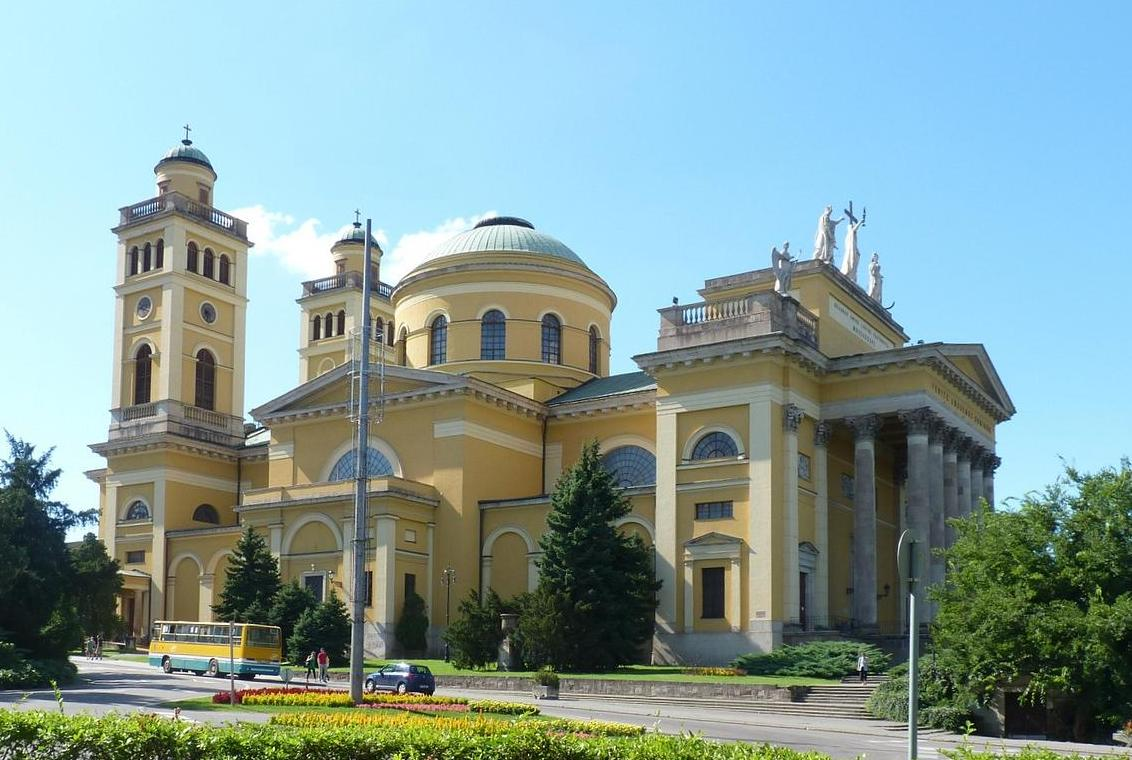
- Eger Cathedral Basilcia

Location
- Country: Hungary
- Ecclesiastical province: Eger

Statistics
- Area: 11,500 km^{2} (4,400 sq mi)
- Population: Total; Catholics: (as of 2013); 1,260,000; 685,000 (54.4%)

Information
- Denomination: Catholic
- Sui iuris church: Latin Church
- Rite: Roman Rite
- Cathedral: Cathedral Basilica of St John the Evangelist, St Michael and the Immaculate Conception in Eger

Current leadership
- Pope: Leo XIV
- Archbishop: Csaba Ternyák

Map
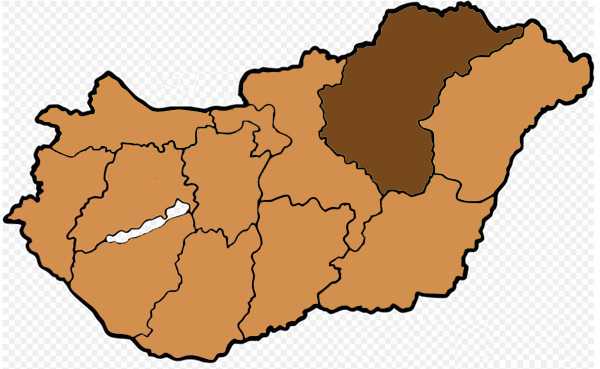
- Map of the archdiocese

Website
- eger.egyhazmegye.hu

The Archdiocese of Eger (Latin: Archidioecesis Agriensis) is a Latin Church archdiocese of the Catholic Church in Northern Hungary. Its centre is the city of Eger.

== History ==
- 1000: Established as Diocese of Eger
- August 9, 1804: Promoted as Metropolitan Archdiocese of Eger with four suffragan dioceses: Satu Mare (until 1930), Spiš (until 1937), Košice (until 1977) and Rožňava (until 1977)

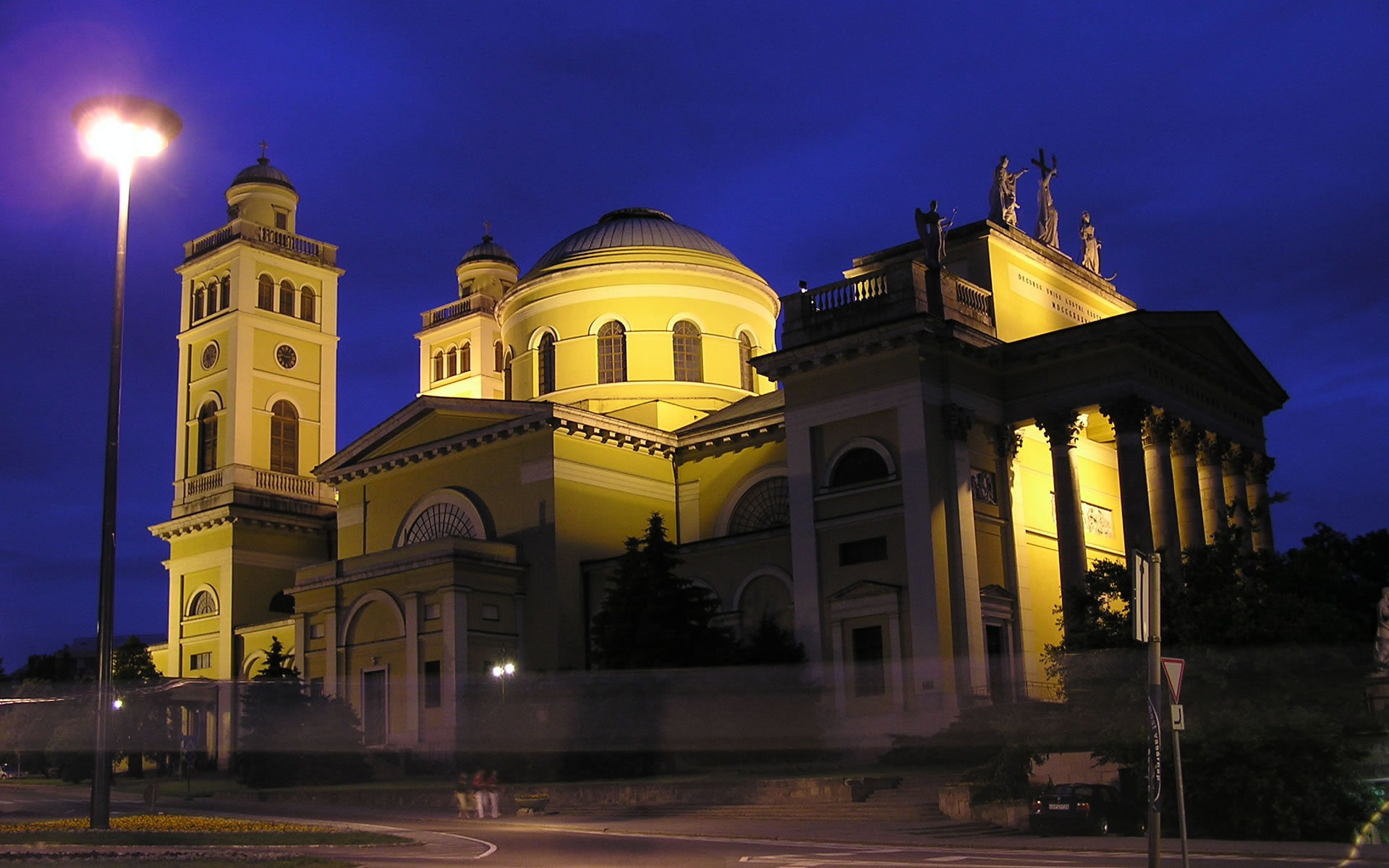
Szent János apostol és evangélista, Szent Mihály főangyal, Szeplőtelen Fogantatás főszékesegyház bazilika (Metropolitan Cathedral Basilica of St. John the Apostle and Evangelist, St. Michael and the Immaculate Conception)

- 1993: It received two new suffragan dioceses, Debrecen-Nyíregyháza (then created) and Vác

== Ordinaries, in reverse chronogical order ==
=== Archbishops of Eger ===
- Csaba Ternyák (2007-present)
- István Seregély (1987–2007)
- László Kádár, O. Cist. (1978–1986)
- József Bánk (1974–1978)
- Pál Brezanóczy (1969–1972)
- Gyula Czapik (1943–1956)
- Lajos Szmrecsányi (1912–1943)
- József Samassa (1873–1912) (Cardinal in 1905)
- Béla Bartakovics (1850–?)
- Ladislaus Pyrker, O.Cist. (1827–1847)
- István Fisher (1807–1822)
- Ferenc Fuchs (1804–?)

=== Bishops of Eger ===
- Tamás Pálffy (1660–1678)
- Benedict Kisdy (1648–1660)
- György Jakusics (1642–1647)
- György Lippay (1637–1642)
- István Szuhay (1600–1607)
- Antal Verancsics (1560–1573), appointed Archbishop of Esztergom (elevated to Cardinal in 1573)
- Ferenc Ujlaky (1554–1555)
- Pál Várdai (1523–1526)
- Tamás Bakócz (1497–1497), appointed Archbishop of Esztergom and later Latin Patriarch of Constantinople (elevated to Cardinal in 1500)
- Ascanio Sforza (1492–1497)
- Johann Beckenschlager (1467–1474)
- Michael Szécsényi (1363–1377)
- Nicholas Dörögdi (1330–1361)
- Csanád Telegdi (1322–1330), appointed Archbishop of Esztergom
- Martin (1306–1322)
- Andrew (1275–1305)
- Lampert Hont-Pázmány (1245–1275)
- Cletus Bél (1224–1245)
- Thomas (1217–1224), appointed Archbishop of Esztergom
- Chama (1158–1166), appointed Archbishop of Kalocsa
- Lucas (1156–1158), appointed Archbishop of Esztergom
- Martyrius (1142–1150), appointed Archbishop of Esztergom

== Suffragan dioceses ==
- Roman Catholic Diocese of Debrecen–Nyíregyháza
- Roman Catholic Diocese of Vác

== See also ==
- Catholic Church in Hungary

== Sources ==
- GCatholic.org
- Catholic Hierarchy
- Diocese website (in Hungarian)
- Diocese website
