= List of archbishops of Košice =

Below are listed the bishops (until 1995) and archbishops of Roman Catholic Archdiocese of Košice.

Image	Name	Start of position	End of position	Note
	Ondrej Szabó	1804	† 27 September 1819	
	Štefan Csech	1820	† 4 June 1831	
Imre Palugyay Imre	Imrich Palugyai	24 February 1832	18 February 1839	Appointed as the bishop of Nitra
Anton Ocskay	Anton Ocskay	7 May 1838	† 11 September 1848	
József Kunszt	Jozef Kunszt	20 May 1850	15 March 1852	Appointed as archbishop of Kalocsa
Ignác Fábry	Ignác Fábry	15 March 1852.	† 26 June 1867	
János Perger	Ján Perger	13 March 1868.	† 5 April 1876	
Konstantin Schuster	Konštantín Schuster	1 July 1877	1886	Appointed as bishop of Vác
Bubics Zsigmond	Žigmund Bubics	30 May 1887	† 22 May 1907	
Augustín Fischer-Colbrie	Augustín Fischer-Colbrie	6 August 1906	† 17 May 1925	
	Jozef Čársky	12 December 1925	11 November 1938	Apostolic Administrator
	Štefan Madarász	19 July 1939	† 8 August 1948	
	Jozef Čársky	28 February 1945	† 11 March 1962	Apostolic administrator
	Štefan Onderko	15 March 1962	1990	The Diocese was without a bishop until the fall of the communist regime. Onderko served as vicar during this period.
Alojz Tkáč, 2019	Alojz Tkáč	14 February 1990	4 June 2010	retired
Bernard Bober	Mons. Bernard Bober	4 June 2010	14 October 2026	resigned
	Mons. Marek Forgáč	14 October 2026	present	

== See also ==
- Lists of patriarchs, archbishops, and bishops
