= Bernard Bober =

Slovak Roman Catholic prelate (born 1950)

His Excellency Bernard Bober
- Metropolitan Archbishop Emeritus of Košice
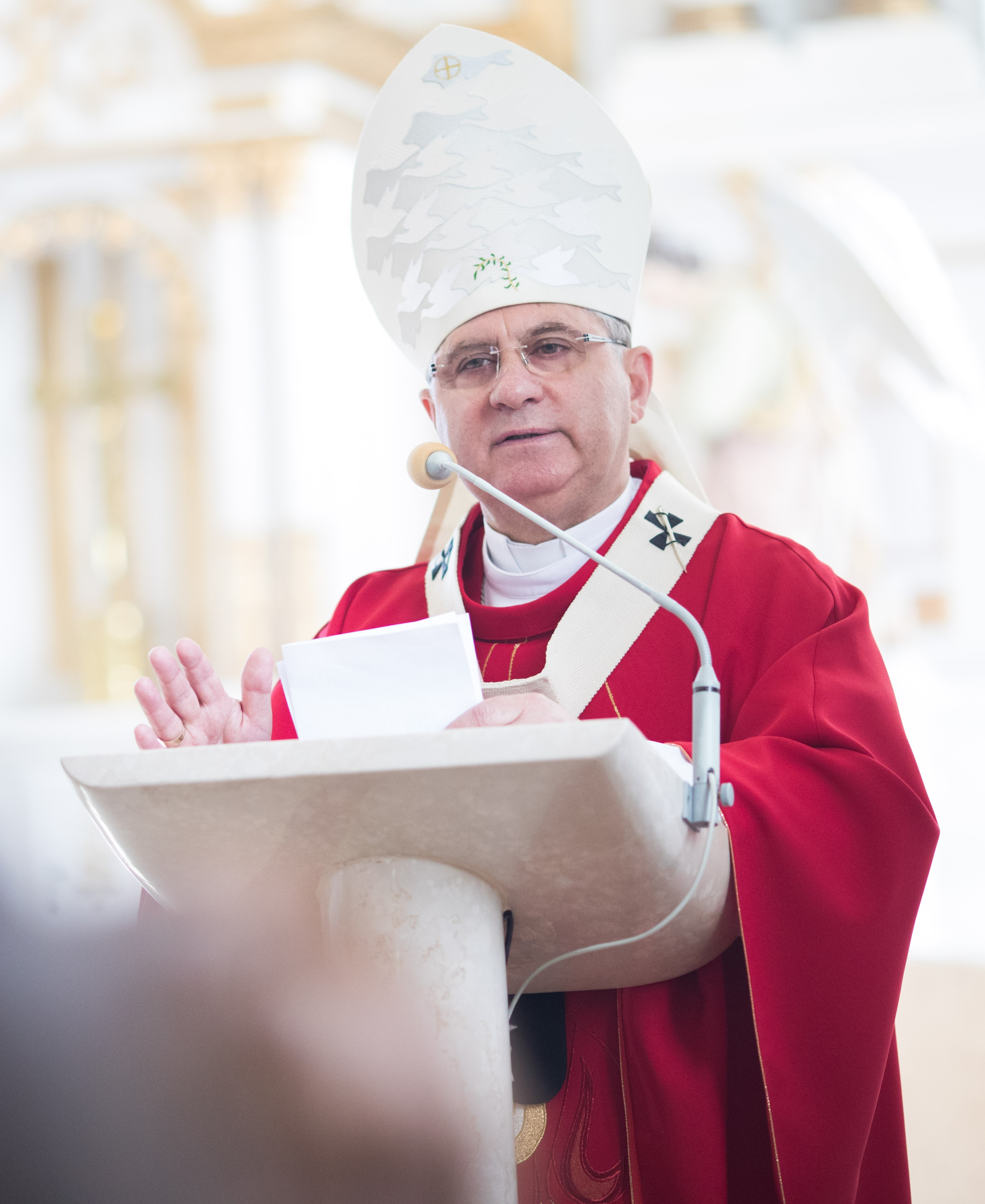
- Bober in 2018
- Church: Roman Catholic
- Appointed: 4 June 2010
- Term ended: 14 October 2026
- Predecessor: Alojz Tkáč
- Successor: Marek Forgáč
- Previous post: Auxiliary bishop of Košice (1992–2010)

Orders
- Ordination: 8 June 1974
- Consecration: 30 January 1993 by Jozef Tomko

Personal details
- Born: 3 November 1950 (age 75) Zbudské Dlhé, Czechoslovakia
- Motto: Cum caritate oboedientia et misericordia (Latin for 'With love, obedience and mercy')
- Coat of arms

Styles of Alojz Tkáč
- Reference style: His Excellency; The Most Reverend
- Spoken style: Your Excellency
- Religious style: Archbishop

Monsignor Bernard Bober (born 3 November 1950) is a Slovak Roman Catholic prelate. He serves as the Apostolic Administrator following the conclusion of his 16 year tenure as the Metropolitan Archbishop of Archdiocese of Košice (2010 2026), and the Grand Chancellor of the Catholic University in Ružomberok.

== Biography ==
Bernard Bober was born on 3 November 1950 in the village of Zbudské Dlhé in Czechoslovakia. He was ordained priest on 8 June 1974 in the St Martin's Cathedral in Bratislava. Following his ordination, he served as a chaplain in the towns of Humenné, Snina and Zborov. From 1978 to 1990 he was the parish priest in the village of Kecerovce. In 1991 he was named the vicar general of the Diocese of Košice.

On 29 December 1992 Bober was named Auxiliary Bishop of Košice and Titular Bishop of Vissalsa by the Pope John Paul II. He was consecrated on 30 January 1993 at the Cathedral of St. Elizabeth in Košice by the Cardinal Jozef Tomko and co-consecrated by the Bishop of Košice Alojz Tkáč and Archbishop of Trnava Ján Sokol. On 4 June 2010, he succeeded Tkáč as the head of the Archdiocese of Košice.

On 10 October 2022, Bober replaced Archbishop of Bratislava Stanislav Zvolenský as the head of the Conference of Slovak Bishops.

In addition to Church offices, Bober also serves as the Grand Chancellor of the Catholic University in Ružomberok.

In 2025, Bober claimed that there is a lack of objective evaluation of the role of the fascist World War II era leader Jozef Tiso. His claim was widely criticized by Slovak historians.

In November 2025 at the request of Pope Leo XIV, the Portuguese priest and DJ Padre Guilherme played a live set outside the Cathedral of St. Elizabeth to mark Bober's 75th birthday.

Catholic Church titles
Preceded by Alojz Tkáč	Roman Catholic Archdiocese of Košice; 2010–present	Succeeded by –
Preceded by Alojzy Orszulik	Roman Catholic Titular See of Vissalsa; 1992–2010	Succeeded by Neal Buckon
