= Sławomir Cudak =

Academic, rector of Akademia Wymiaru Sprawiedliwości

Sławomir Cudak is an academic, acting rector of Akademia Wymiaru Sprawiedliwości.

== Biography ==
In 2005 he obtained doctorate from Instytut Badań Edukacyjnych in Warsaw upon dissertation Funkcje wychowawcze rodziców wobec dziecka niepełnosprawnego supervised by Mirosław Józef Szymański. In 2008 he obtained habilitation from the Catholic University in Ružomberok. In September 2026 his appointment as acting rector of Akademia Wymiaru Sprawiedliwości in the place of Michał Sopiński, who was removed from office, resulted in protests. His research interests include family and its functioning in the contemporary world.

== Books ==
- Wychowawcze i emocjonalne funkcjonowanie rodziny z dzieckiem niepełnosprawnym. Wydawnictwo Akademii Humanistyczno-Ekonomicznej w Łodzi. 2011. ISBN 9788374055215.
