= Seleuciana =

Seleuciana was an ancient city and bishopric in modern Algeria. It is now a Catholic titular see. As of 2026 the location has not been identified, but it was a dependency of Carthage.

== History ==
Seleuciana was a city in the Roman province of Numidia. It was important enough to become a bishopric, but is only mentioned twice, in 411 and 484.

Bishop Proficius of Seleuciana is mentioned by Victor Vitensis as summoned to Huneric's conference of Carthage in 484.

== Titular see ==
In 1964, the diocese was nominally restored as titular see of the lowest (episcopal) rank.

It has had the following (non-consecutive) incumbents:

- 1964 – 1977: Giovanni Bianchi
- 1984 – 2016: Gonzalo López Marañón, Discalced Carmelites (O.C.D.), Apostolic Vicar of San Miguel de Sucumbíos (Ecuador)
- 2016 – 2026: Marek Forgáč, Auxiliary bishop of the Archdiocese of Košice (Slovakia)
