= Marek Forgáč =

Slovak Roman Catholic prelate (born 1974)

His Excellency The Most Reverend Monsignor Prof. Dr. Marek Forgáč, Ph.D
- Metropolitan Archbishop-designate of Košice
- Mons. Marek Forgáč in 2026
- Church: Roman Catholic
- Archdiocese: Roman Catholic Archdiocese of Košice
- Appointed: 14 October 2026
- Predecessor: Bernard Bober
- Previous post: Auxiliary bishop of Košice (2016–2026)

Orders
- Ordination: 19 June 1999 by Mons. Alojz Tkáč
- Consecration: 1 September 2016 by Bernard Bober

Personal details
- Born: Marek Forgáč; 22 January 1974 (age 52) Košice, Czechoslovakia
- Education: Pontifical Gregorian University
- Motto: Gaudete Semper qui Dominus Prope est (Latin for 'Rejoice always, for the Lord has come near.')
- Coat of arms

Styles of Marek Forgáč
- Reference style: His Excellency; The Most Reverend; Monsignor
- Spoken style: Your Excellency
- Religious style: Archbishop

His Excellency. The Most Reverend. Monsignor. Prof. Dr. Marek Forgáč, Ph.D (born 21 January 1974 in Košice) is Slovak bishop and prelate who has been the Metropolitan Archbishop of the Archdiocese of Košice since 2026 and previously served as the titular bishop of Seleuciana and the auxiliary bishop of Archdiocese of Košice since 2016-2026. In years 2011 — 2016, he served as Pro Dean of the Faculty of Theology of the Catholic University in Košice.

== Priesthood ==
Marek Forgáč has been a priest since his was ordinated by Mons. Alojz Tkáč, archbishop of Košice, on 19 June 1999. He was serving in the parish of Trebišov (1999 — 2000), the parish of Snina (2000 — 2001) and the parish of Humenné (2001 — 2002). Then, in years 2002 — 2004, he was chaplain in the University Pastoral Centre of St Martyrs of Košice in Košice.

In the following years, he was studying for a Licentiate at Institute of psychology of Pontifical Gregorian University in Rome. After the studies, he returned to the University Pastoral Centre of St Martyrs of Košice in Košice as its spiritual administrator. He stayed at this post from 2007 to 2016.

He absolved his doctoral studies at the Faculty of Arts of the University of Trnava in the department of social psychology in years 2008 — 2012. In years 2011 — 2016, he served as Pro Dean of the Faculty of Theology of the Catholic University in Košice.

He habilitated as docent at the Faculty of Theology of the Catholic University in Košice in year 2015.

He lectures pastoral and general psychology and clinical, general and applicated psychology of matrimony and family.

== Bishop ==
On 11 June 2016, Pope Francis appointed him as the Auxiliary Bishop of Archdiocese of Košice and the Titular Bishop of Seleuciana. His episcopal consecration took place in Cathedral of St. Elizabeth of Hungary in Košice on 1 September 2016. Forgáč was ordained by Bernard Bober, Archbishop of Košice, Cardinal Jozef Tomko, Prefect Emeritus of the Congregation for the Evangelization of Peoples, and Mario Giordana, Apostolic Nuncio in Slovakia.

On 14 October 2026, Pope Leo XIV appointed him as the Metropolitan Archbishop of the Archdiocese of Košice.
