= Zbudské Dlhé =

- Municipality
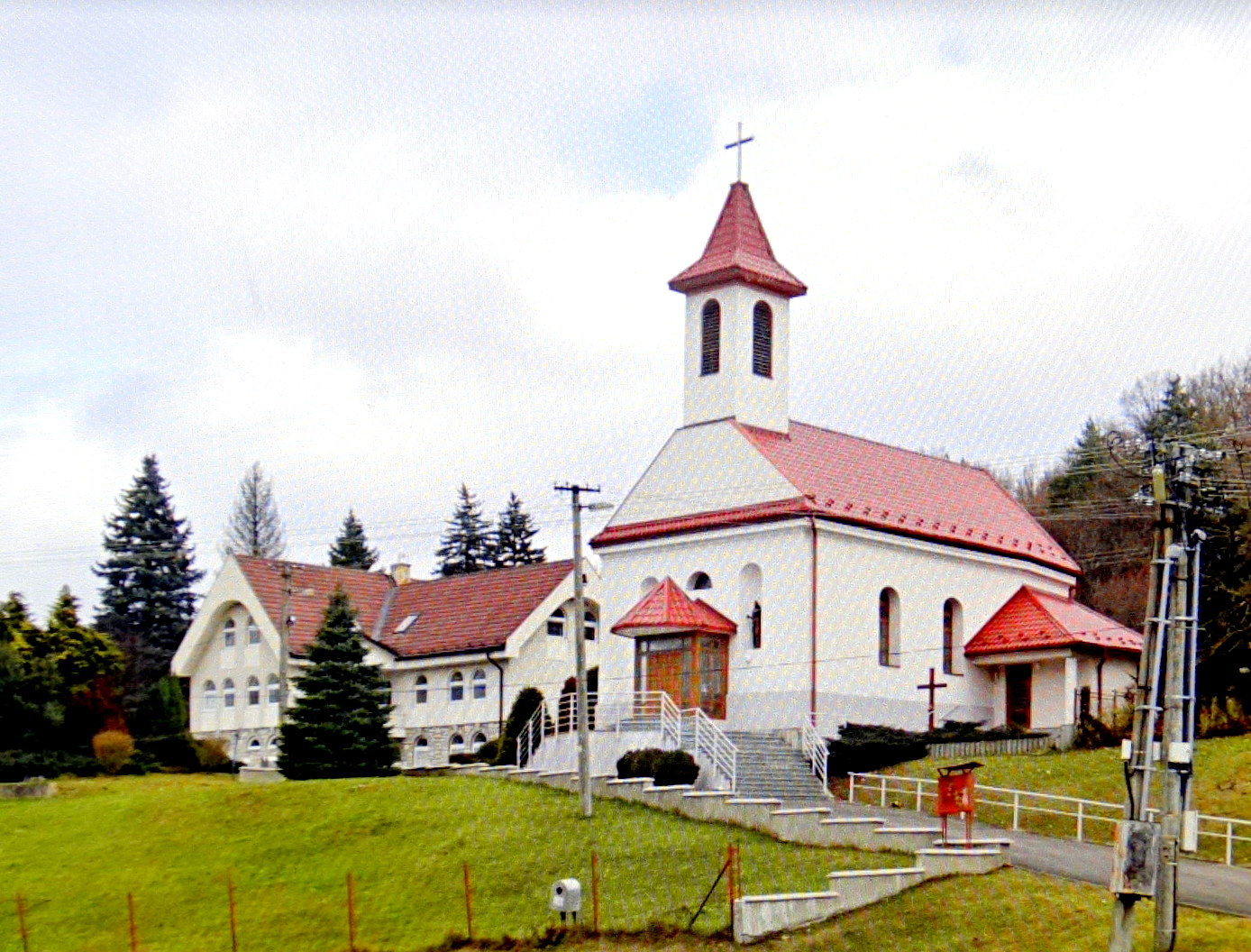

- Flag

- Location of Zbudské Dlhé in the Prešov Region Location of Zbudské Dlhé in Slovakia
- Coordinates: 49.08°N 21.97°E
- Country: Slovakia
- Region: Prešov Region
- District: Humenné District
- First mentioned: 1414

Area
  - Total: 8.35 km^{2} (3.22 sq mi)
- Elevation: 199 m (653 ft)

Population (2025)
  - Total: 839
- Time zone: UTC+1 (CET)
  - Summer (DST): UTC+2 (CEST)
- Postal code: 671 2
- Area code: +421 57
- Vehicle registration plate (until 2022): HE
- Website: www.zbudskedlhe.sk

Zbudské Dlhé is a village and municipality in Humenné District in the Prešov Region of north-east Slovakia.

== History ==
In historical records the village was first mentioned in 1414.

== Geography ==
The municipality lies at an altitude of 199 metres (653 ft) and covers an area of 8.35 km^{2} (3.22 sq mi) (2025).

== Population ==
Population statistic (10 years)
Year	1995	2005	2015	2025
Count	474	598	705	839
Difference		+26.16%	+17.89%	+19.00%

Population statistic
Year	2024	2025
Count	828	839
Difference		+1.32%

It has a population of 839 people (31 December 2025).

=== Ethnicity ===
Census 2021 (1+ %)
Ethnicity	Number	Fraction
Romani	537	69.83%
Slovak	198	25.74%
Not found out	32	4.16%
Total	769	

In year 2021 was 769 people by ethnicity 537 as Romani, 198 as Slovak, 32 as Not found out, 7 as Rusyn, 3 as Czech and 1 as Ukrainian.

Note on population: The difference values of population numbers in the table "Population statistic" and in the sections "Ethnicity" & "Religion" is caused by the use of various statistical methods.

The vast majority of the municipality's population consists of the local Roma community. In 2019, they constituted an estimated 73% of the local population.

=== Religion ===
Census 2021 (1+ %)
Religion	Number	Fraction
Roman Catholic Church	718	93.37%
Not found out	28	3.64%
Greek Catholic Church	13	1.69%
Total	769	

In year 2021 was 769 people by religion 718 from Roman Catholic Church, 28 from Not found out, 13 from Greek Catholic Church, 6 from None, 3 from Eastern Orthodox Church and 1 from Church of the Brethren.

== Notable people ==
- Alojz Tkáč (1934-2023), (Arch)bishop of Košice (1990-2010)
