= Guilherme Peixoto =

Portuguese Catholic priest and DJ

The Reverend Guilherme Peixoto
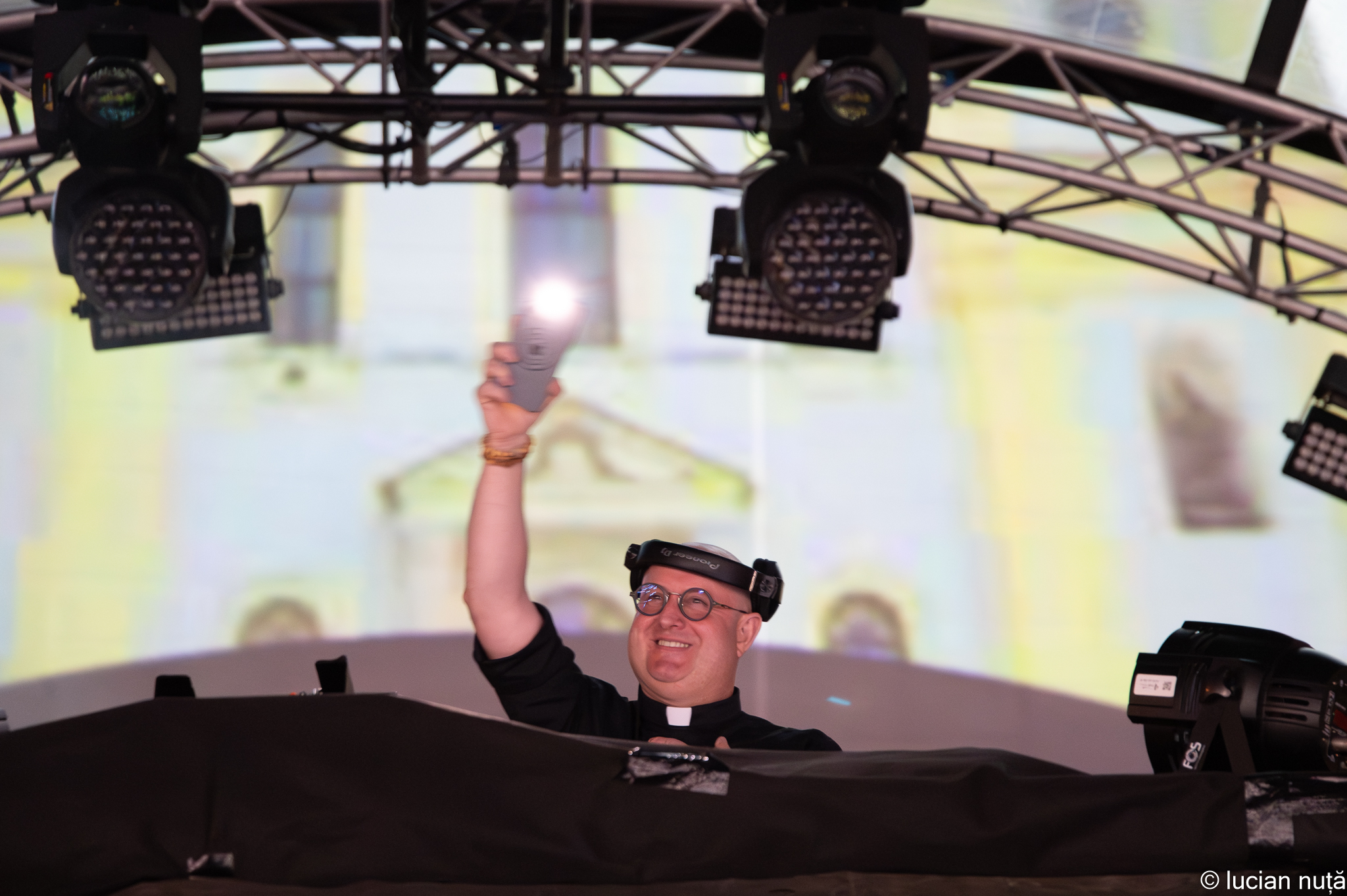
- Padre Guilherme performing in Cluj-Napoca, Romania, in July 2025

Background information
- Also known as: Padre Guilherme, DJ Priest
- Born: Guilherme Guimarães Peixoto; 31 July 1974 (age 52); Azurém, Guimarães, Portugal
- Genre: Techno DJ
- Years active: 2020-present

Guilherme Guimarães Peixoto, best known as Padre Guilherme (born 31 July 1974), is a Portuguese Catholic priest and DJ, who blends electronic dance and religious music in his live sets. His performances at World Youth Day in 2023, and another featuring Pope Leo XIV in 2025 both went viral on social media.

In October 2026, he appeared at number 79 at the DJ Mag Top 100 DJs Top 100 DJs list.

== Life and career ==
Guilherme Peixoto was born in Guimarães, Portugal, in 1974. He has been a priest since 1999, and has served both in the Portuguese Army as chaplain, on tours to Kosovo and Afghanistan, and as a parish priest in Laundos and Amorim in the Archdiocese of Braga, northern Portugal.

It was during a tour of Afghanistan in 2010, when Peixoto was organising social events for soldiers, that he began to DJ. Back in Portugal, he took classes in DJing and then began to put on club nights as fundraisers for his parish church in Laundos.

During the Covid-19 pandemic, Peixoto began streaming weekly DJ sets where he combined electronic dance music with religious and folk music, and became known as the "DJ Priest", or "Padre Guilherme". In 2023, he performed an early-morning outdoor set for World Youth Day in Lisbon, which went viral on social media. He has also performed beneath the Christ the Redeemer statue in Rio de Janeiro, Brazil, and at other festivals including the Medusa Festival in Spain and the Zamna festival in Chile. In November 2025, another of Peixoto's live performances went viral, when his set outside the Cathedral of St. Elizabeth, Košice, Slovakia, to mark Archbishop Bernard Bober's 75th birthday featured an appearance by Pope Leo XIV. In August 2026, he performed on the main stage of the Untold Festival in Romania.

== Music and discography ==
Peixoto playing

Peixoto's music blends the beats of electronic dance music with aspects of the religious world, including songs (Ave Maria), church bells, and excerpts from papal encyclical letters such as Pope Francis' Laudato si' and Fratelli Tutti.

Peioxoto has released several tracks on his label, Lux Aeterna Records, and others in collaboration with other artists.

- "Ave Maria" (2022) with Karetus
- Povoa Bendita (EP, 2023)
- Selfish Love II (EP, 2024), remix of a song by Pedro Cazanova
- Veneremur Et Adoremus (EP, 2025), with Ebmath
- Integral Ecology (EP, 2025)
