= Co-Cathedral of Saint Nicholas, Prešov =

Co-Cathedral of Saint Nicholas
- Slovak: Konkatedrála svätého Mikuláša
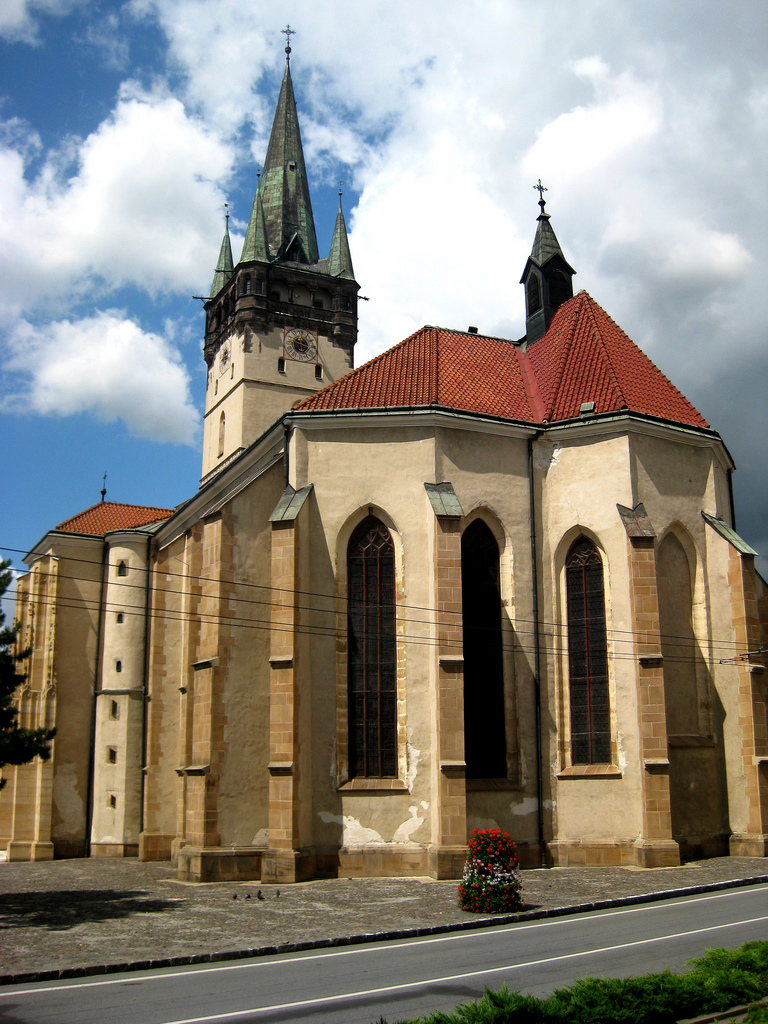

- Location in Slovakia
- 48°59′53″N 21°14′24″E
- Location: Prešov
- Country: Slovakia
- Denomination: Roman Catholic
- Website: Website of the Cathedral

History
- Status: Active
- Founded: 14th century
- Dedication: Saint Nicholas

Architecture
- Functional status: Cathedral and Parish church
- Architectural type: Church
- Style: Baroque and Gothic
- Completed: 1515

Administration
- Archdiocese: Košice

Clergy
- Bishop: Bernard Bober

The Co-Cathedral of Saint Nicholas (Slovak: Konkatedrála svätého Mikuláša) in Prešov is one of the oldest and most important churches in Slovakia. The external dimensions of the cathedral are 54.7m in length and 34.45m in width. The indoor nave is 16 m tall and the tower reaches a height of 71 meters. The temple's design takes inspiration from the Late Gothic hall churches with three naves.

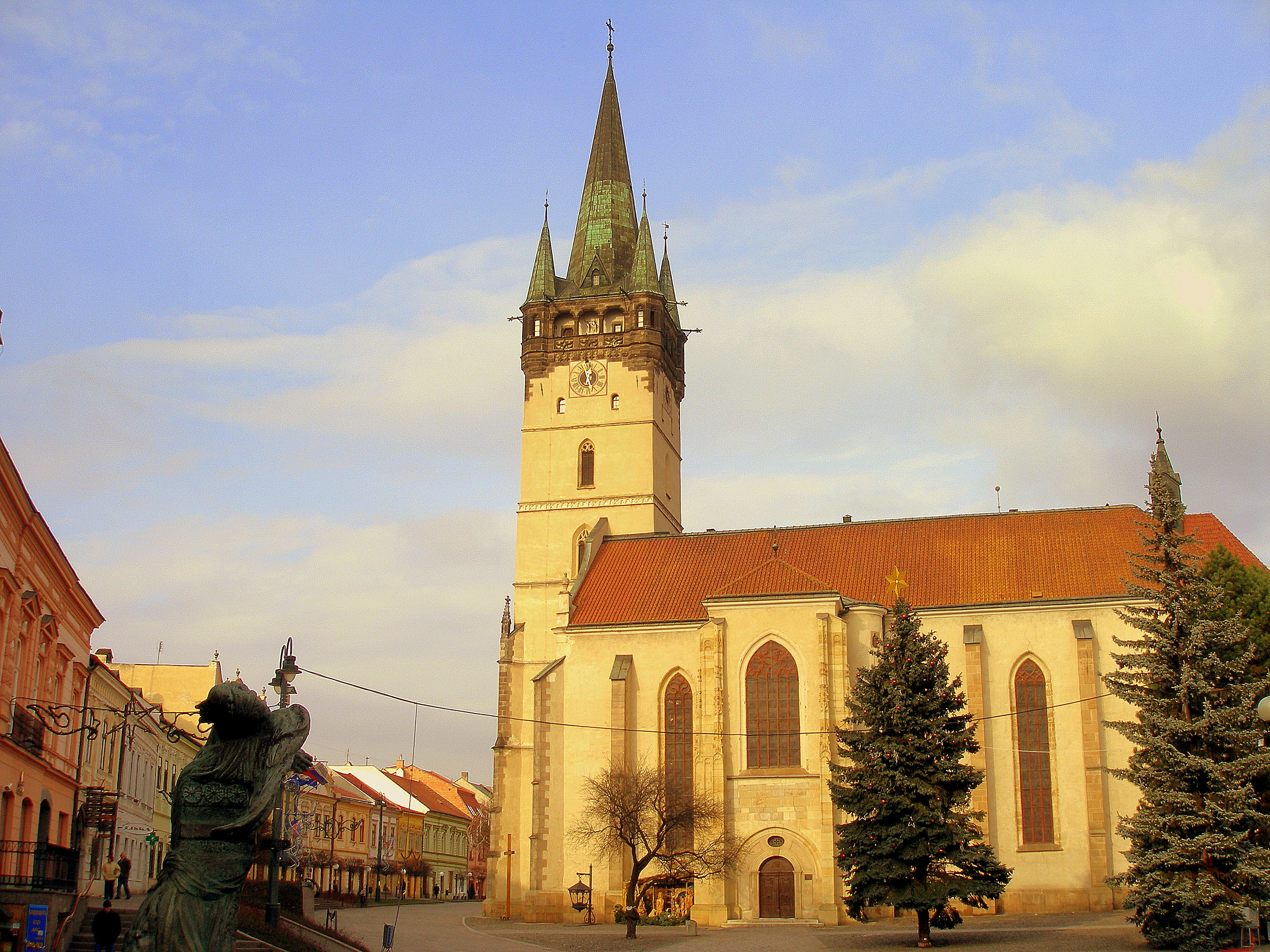
Concathedral st. Nicholas, Prešov, Slovakia

== Description ==
The cathedral is a hall temple with a polygonal ending of the presbytery, which is vaulted in Gothic style with net and stellar vaults. There is a prolonged choir with stellar vaults connected to the main presbytery with a pointed arch on the north side of the presbytery. Arches in the upper part are designed as tribunes. The choir extension on the south side has a polygonal end and stellar vault. Pointed arcades separate the individual naves. Arcades are supported by massive polygonal pillars. A vaulting of the main nave is different from the side naves. The nave has a Late Gothic stellar vault and the side naves have stellar and net vaults. Parts of bend shafts and brackets on the north side have been preserved from the original Gothic church. The south part of the side nave is vaulted with a cross vault with figural brackets at its end. The cathedral has original Gothic windows with graduated tracery all around its circuit. The original supporting pillars are preserved as well. The domination of the building is the tower, which has pseudo-Gothic arcades and a high pyramidal roof, which was built in 1903. The entrance of the tower is with a Gothic portal. There were built smaller towers as a decoration on the corners of the main tower.

There is a Late Gothic portal on the south side. Its lining is richly profiled and crossed in the peak. The portal area is decorated with blind flamboyant tracery. It leads into the southern stellar vaulted hall, which was built in 1509. Another church portal is on the north side. It is smaller and it has retained its original Gothic carved door from the 15th century. It leads to a spiral staircase finishing in the oratory on the second floor. The original main Gothic portal was rebuilt and reduced in the late 18th century. The decoration of "coin" ornaments was placed into the lining of the reduced portal.

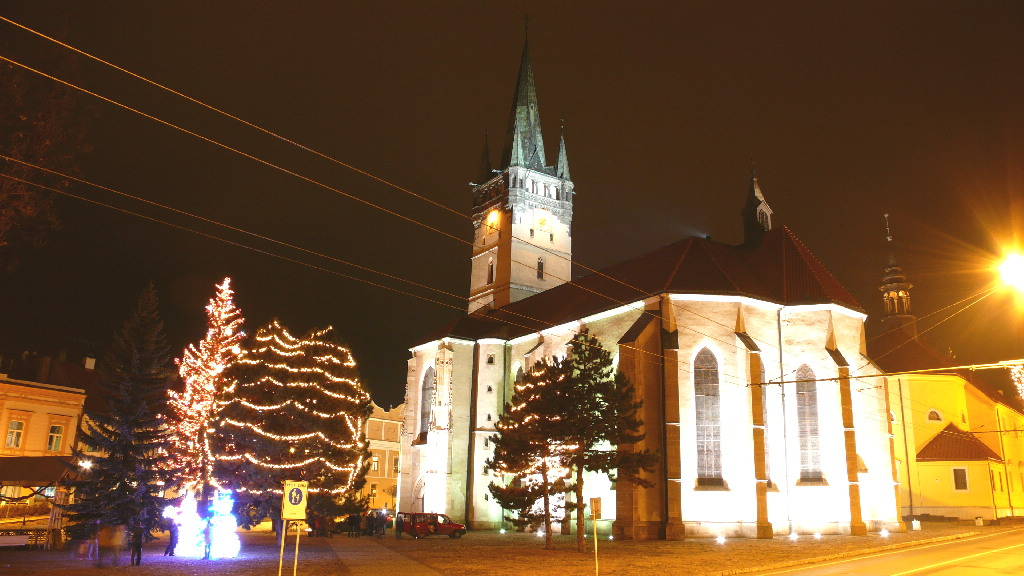
Concathedral Presov at night

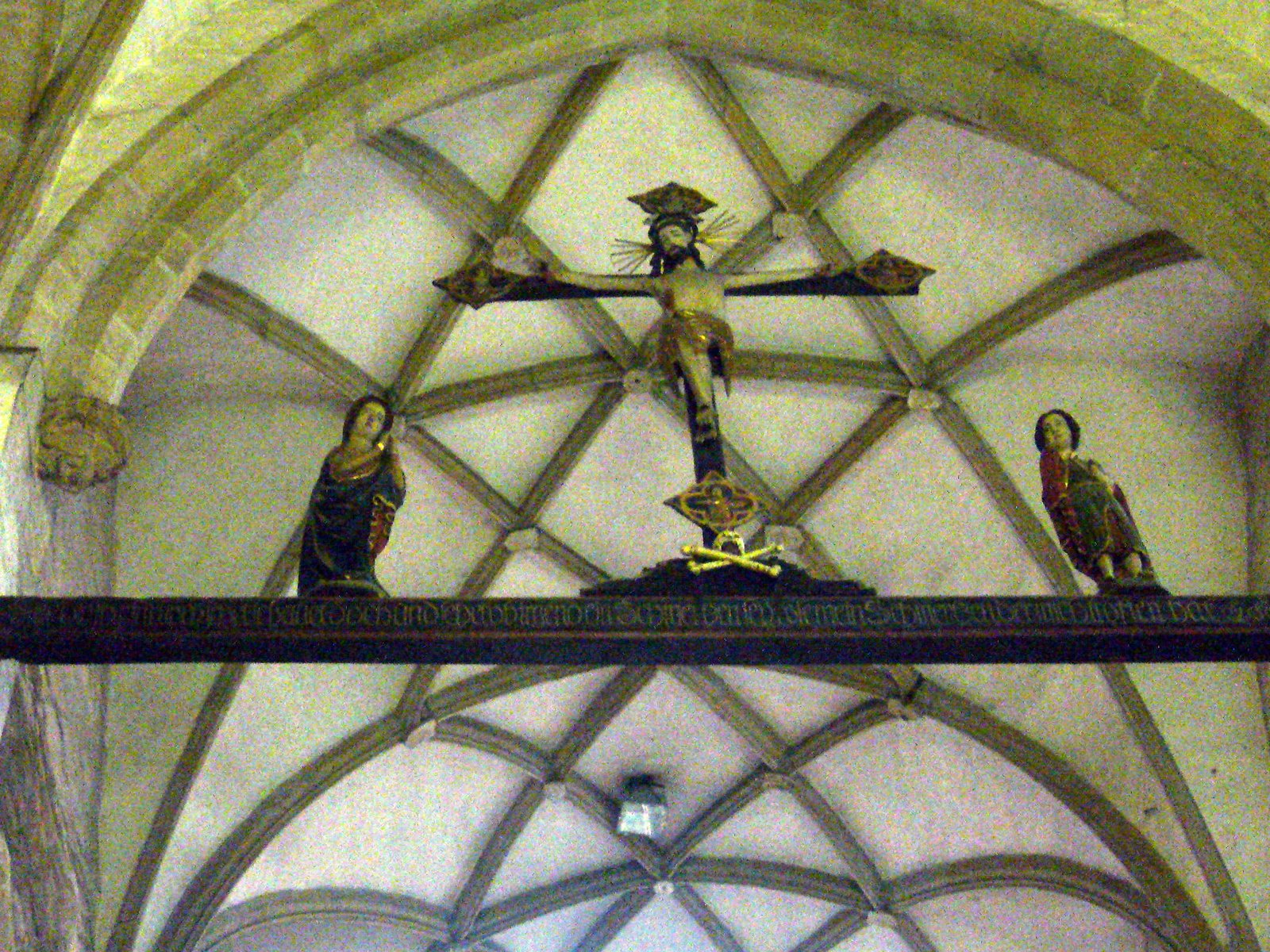
Concathedral Presov, Interior

== The beginnings ==
The church was built in the middle of the 14th century in the widest part of the square as a spacious three nave structure, on the foundations of an earlier sacral building from the 13th century. From this building remained only brackets on the front side of the medieval triumphal arch, rests of shafts and brackets in the form of a man's head on the peripheral wall of the northern nave. The northern portal with the tracery panels in so called soft decoration style were carved around 1400. A fire in 1418 destroyed construction, but in 1420 to 1440 the construction of the northern presbytery continued with vaulting two bays of four armed stellar-vaults. It was inspired by the Czech Gothic architecture of Peter Parler. The whole triumphal arch was finished around the year 1440. The middle presbytery was extended and vaulted with net and stellar vault.

== The most important reconstruction ==
The third stage, which was conceptually unifying existing disparate complex, is associated with the name of the builder John Brengyszeyna, who was leading master of the Late Gothic reconstruction of the church in the years 1502-1515. In 1502 the building expanded in the south in the Late Gothic style. Three naves were completed in 1505. The entire reconstruction was completed in 1515. During this period sanctuary side was vaulted, entrance hall of the church was finished and jambs and windows were stone craved. Master builder Brengyszeyna cooperated with stonemason Nicholas from Levoca.

The new church nave and the south hallway with oratory were built in 1511. Oratory has decoration with Late Gothic motifs of rotating flamed tracery. As it is known from the latest research, vaulted bolts in the southern nave still have the original polychrome colours. Stone portraits of Hungarian kings: st. Ladislaus, st. Stephen. and st. Imrich on the heel of vault on the southern wall of the south nave were polychromed by painter Peter Moler. Fillings of tracery windows were painted red, arch ribs in naves were painted white. An inscription tape was painted on the triumphal arch of the south with the beginning of rebuilding of the temple in 1502. In 1514-1515 Master Jan rebuilt the temple tower. He vaulted the tower with circular vault on the ground floor. It is the only circular vault in Eastern Slovakia.

== Baroque period ==
The temple has undergone repairs after fire in 1711 and 1788, when the southern Baroque-classical portal with carved gate and original fittings was built. In the first half of the 18th century side altar of the church of St. Anthony of Padua has been added and later Resurrection altar and altar of St. Cross.

== Final adjustments in its present form ==
In the beginning of the 19th century the northern portico was built, in 1823 the cemetery and stone fence around the church was removed. In the years 1903-1904 church tower was rebuilt in Neo-Gothic style by the architect Frigyes Schulek. Interior modifications in 1914 and in the thirties were focused on exchanging the floor. That time the monochrome painting of architectural stone elements were mechanically removed. In the fifties windows of the south nave and presbytery were filed with new stained glass windows. The floor was paved with travertine tiles, the phonics and the new Cross Way lit from behind from stained glass was installed. In the years 1981-1989 last major repair of the church took place.

== Altars and decorations ==
Along with the late Gothic rebuilding of the temple the wing altars were furnished. The dominant of the interior furnishings of the Cathedral of St. Nicholas is the main altar, which was established in 1490-1506. It is a monumental gothic building and there is still original Gothic cabinet with three niches which have gold wall and there are three sculptures in its center. It is decorated with Baroque canopies and drapery on its side. The authorship is attributed to the Prešov craftsman John Weiss. The other two late Gothic sculptures worshiping angels. They are placed on the main ledge of the altar shield. They are made by the stonemason Paul of Levoča in the early 16th century. Other sculptures of worshiping angels are on the sides of the tabernacle. There is the Virgin Mary with Baby Jesus in her arms in the middle of the altar, on her right there is a sculpture of Saint Nicholas and to the left a statue of Saint Adalbert (sv. Vojtech in slovak), the second Bishop of Prague. After a fire in 1673 only a cabinet of main altar of Saint Nicholas with polychrome sculpture of the Madonna, Saint Nicholas, Saint Adalbert in lifesize and three of the four Evangelists sculptures on consoles with a canopy has been preserved. The authorship of the altar is attributed to the Prešov carver John Weiss, who lived there back in 1509. Some of the remains of a Gothic altar has been put in the wooden Baroque high altar architecture from 1696. The altar is just behind the canteen. It is richly decorated. It has both smooth and twisted columns. There are sculptures of Saint Stephen, Ladislaus, Ignatius and Francis Xavier by woodcarver J. Hartman on the altar stone. Above the altar there is a relief showing turned curtain, with a crown on top and below its peak there is a monogram of the Virgin Mary with rays and heads of angels. The biggest statue of the main altar is a statue of Saint Sebastian, a Roman soldier and martyr with the arrows in his body. On the right side of the sculpture of Saint Sebastian there is a sculpture of Saint Peter with keys in his hand. On the other side there is the apostle Paul with a sword. Both are dressed in Roman togas. There is a sculpture of the Holy Trinity on the top of the altar, under it is placed the medallion with a painted blazon of the town which was used since 1558. The center is decorated with sculptures of angels in late Gothic style by Paul of Levoca from the early 16th century. The stone table comes from the middle of the 18th century. It is richly decorated with rococo ornamentation. On it there is a baroque throne for exposure of the Eucharist with rotating tabernacle and there is a cross inside.

• Altar of Saint Anthony of Padua in Baroque style built in the first half of the 18th century. It is located on the south side of the main altar. Behind the altar is ambit type of altar architecture with twisted columns, section naklady and attachment. Prebulit canteen is Rococo and next there is a door with painting of Saint Peter and Paul. Painting of Saint Anthony of Padua is located in the middle of the altar. In intercolumns there are statues of Saint Roch and John the Evangelist. They are decorated with statues of angels. The lance there is a circular painting of Saint Imrich.

• Altar of the Transfiguration on the Mount Tabor. It is located in the southern nave. The altar is Baroque from the 18th century but is decorated with Renaissance ornaments from the older altars from the 17th century. On the sides of the painting there are pillars that are wrapped with vine leaves. It is decorated with acanthus and late Renaissance ornaments.

• Altar of Saint Joseph in Renaissance and Baroque style from the 18th century. It located in the left nave on the north side. It is made from parts from the 17th century. There is a painting of Saint Joseph and also the painting of the Virgin Mary in the middle of the altar from the 18th century but the painting is placed on prebuilt stone table.

• Altar of the Assumption of the Virgin Mary, Neo-Gothic; in the back of the north side of the temple,

• Altar of Saint Anne with the Blessed Virgin Mary, Neo-Gothic; in the southern part.

Of the many Gothic sculptures from the early 16th century, the Archangel Gabriel, crucifixion and small sculpture of Christ sufferer by Master Paul have been preserved. The original sculpture of Calvary on beam of triumphal arch allegedly damaged fire in the 17th century. The monumental sculpture of the crucified has extremely high artistic quality and its dramatic expressive comprehension is the evidence of the fact that it was created under the influence of German art in the first half of the 14th century. From the Gothic wing altars on both sides 14 painted panels were preserved, originally belonged to the altar of Saint Nicholas and the Virgin Mary. They are traditionally attributed to craftsman Peter and Albert Molers from Presov; they worked on them in 1497-1506. Older written sources mention also the panel painting of Saint Anny Samotretia who got to Nemzeti Museum in Budapest. A Gothic temple facilities also include mural paintings on the north wall of the middle presbytery from the late 15th and the early 16th century, which displays a knight on horseback and female figures.

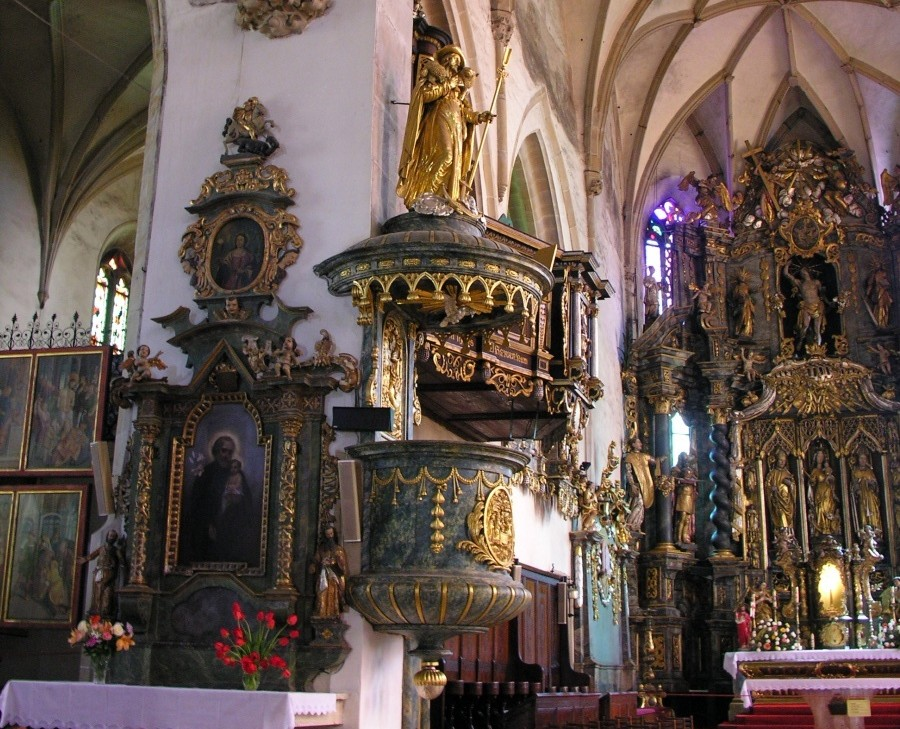
Interior

== Supplements ==
In the second half of the 16th century the temple was furnished in the new Renaissance style. They maintained the four and six seat stalla with wooden inlays, dated from 1568 to 1569 on the side. This is attributed to George Tischler from Kezmarok. On the western chorus in 1634 a large organ was built with rich early Baroque ornamentation and sculpture of St. Michael the Archangel at the top. The northern side of the central presbytery under the Gothic arcades two tribunes with early Baroque railing were added. Into the outer side organ with rich polychrome decoration was put. At the top of the middle organ tower there is a sculpture of King David and on the sides there are statues of angels from Presov carvers. To the column between presbyteries of central and southern naves a baptistery was built in the Renaissance style in the second half of the 16th century. It was made of red marble with wrought copper lid. The lid is made of copper and it is decorated with wrought iron ornaments elevating by rope threaded through the bracket, with relief decorations of winged heads of angels, decorated with wrought scrolls, and on the metal sheet painting decoration of representation of Christ's baptism. Beaten grid with high sculpture of the Good Shepherd on the roof in northern presbytery comes from the same period. It was built at a time when it served the Presov German Lutheran Church. Originally it was an exit from the area of the temple, today it is entrance to the vestry. Stalla are decorated with herm pilasters. The pulpit was made in the 17th century in Renaissance style. Another relief of Christ and the Samaritan is the highlight of the rostrum to the arcuate windowsill. Another relief Christ, this time on a stormy sea, is located on the back panel of the pulpit. A statue of the Good Shepherd and the carved symbols of the three divine virtues rest on a canopy. In 1634 the church was bleached and in 1641 the tower was repaired. In the second half of the 17th century organ gallery was made with carved railing, which includes a smooth sill and a niche with the figure of Christ in its middle. On the sides it has columns decorated with wrapped vines. The parapet is decorated with ornaments and figurines.

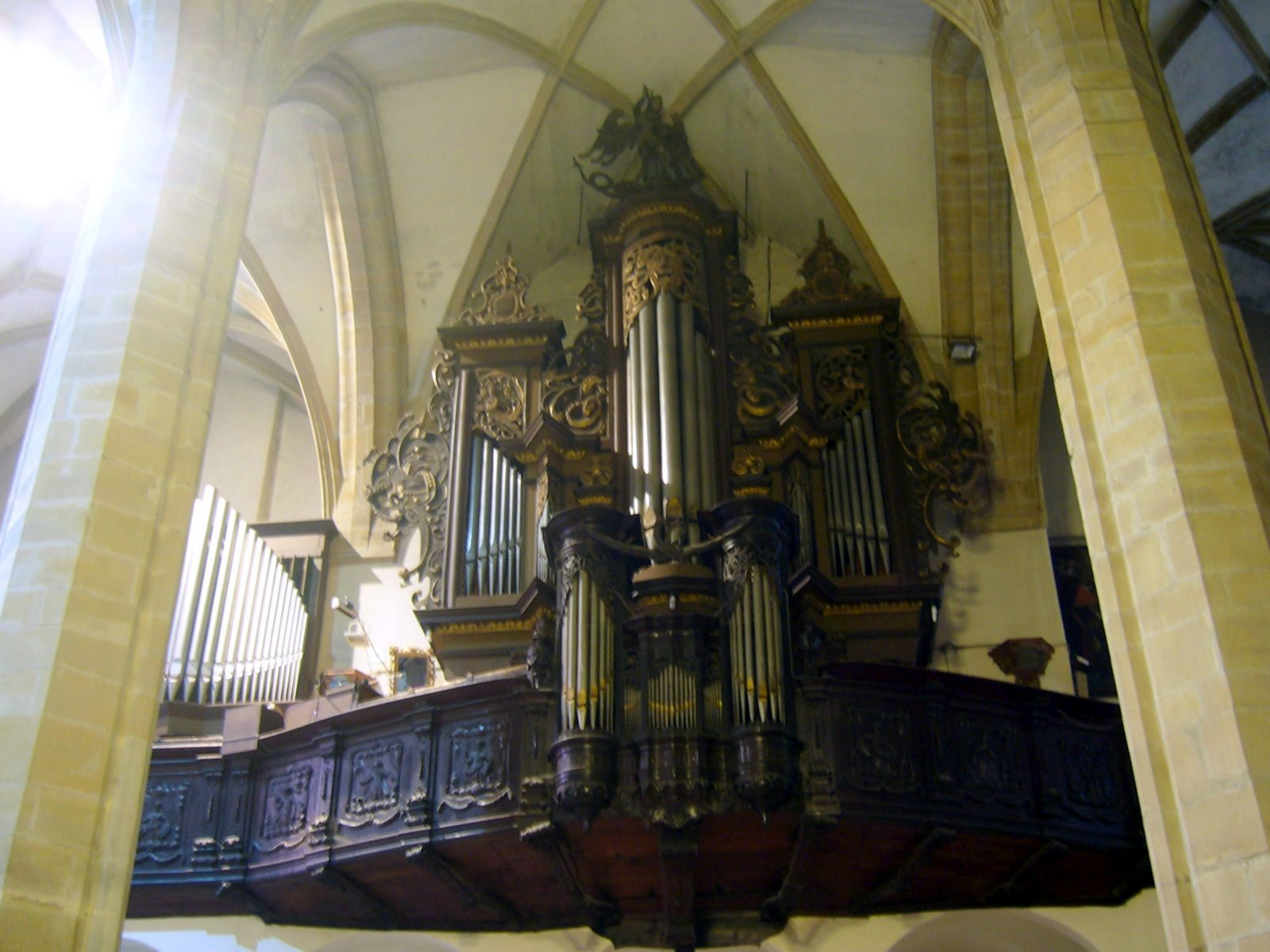
Concathedral Prešov, the main organ

== Great organ ==
Five-part Renaissance - early Baroque organ from the 17th century, decorated with golden eared ornaments, has winged heads and statues of angels on its wings. In its peak rests the statue of St. Giorgio. Baroque tracery of chorus from the second half of the 18th century contains a small organ decorated with acanthus ornamentation. On the windowsill there are reliefs of the apostles individually separated by pilasters with festoons and acanth. It is located in the western part. It consists of 43 registers placed in three boxes. It has 3480 pipes and 20 bells. Threemanual game table controls valves using a pneumatic tracker.

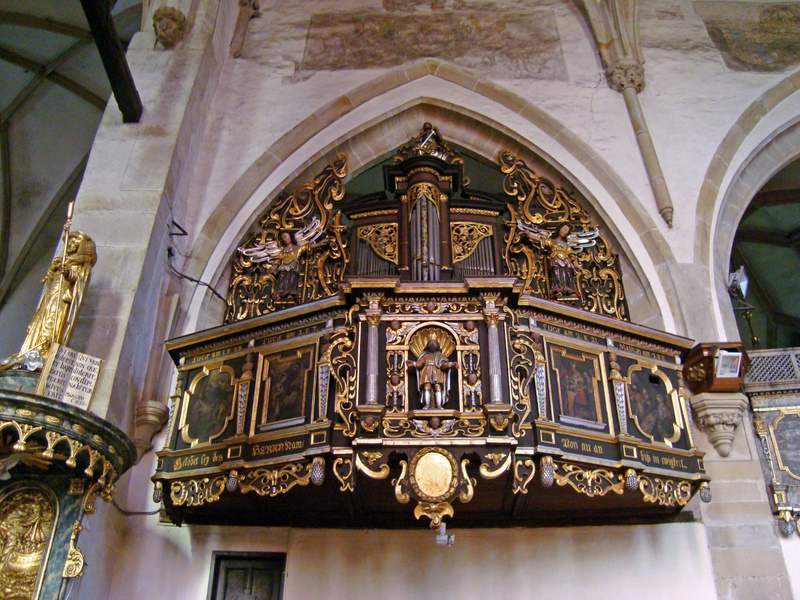
Concathedral Presov, small organ

== Small organ ==
On the side chorus there is another organ in the Renaissance - early Baroque style from the second half of the 17th century. It is located in the main sanctuary of the Renaissance chorus. It is decorated with eared ornaments and statues of angels. Sill of the organ body is polygonal and there are images with scenes of the Annunciation, the Birth and Adoration of three Kings placed. The inside of the body contains 378 pipes of different sizes. Whistles of prospectus are original. The way of painting the biggest decoration is remarkable. It is wrapped with leaves and tassels. Nowadays it is an unused tool. Only the cabinet and pipes which are disconnected and partially damaged are original. The inside of the instrument is Tucek’s organ, op. 299 with outlet tube and a romantic disposition. The organ has been reconstructed at the same time as the reconstruction of major organ by the same company in the 1920s.

== Gallery ==
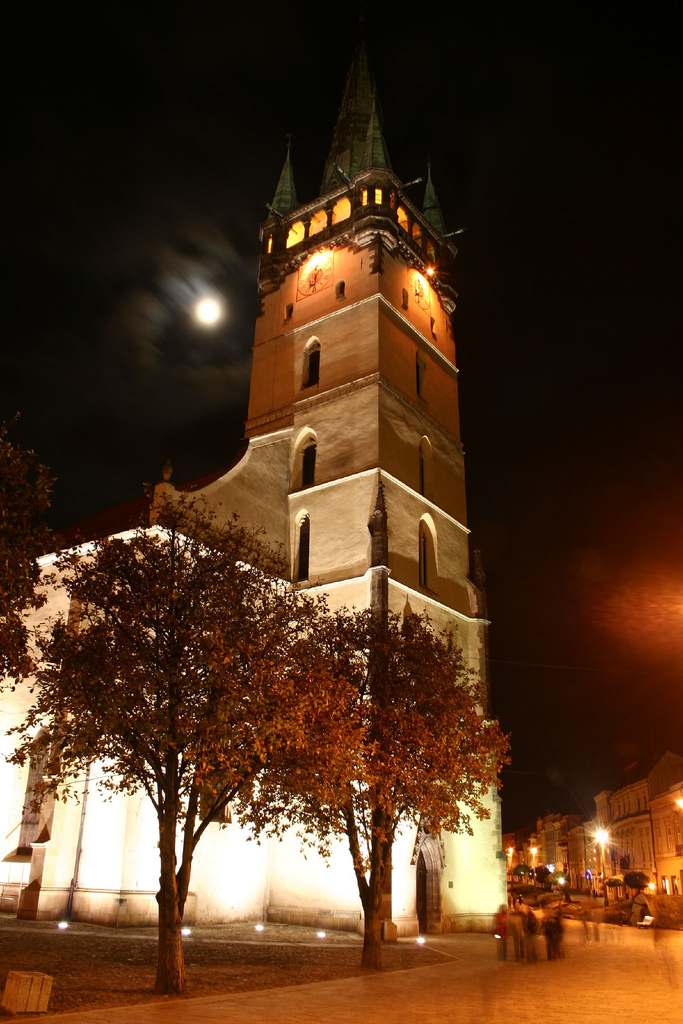
Tower

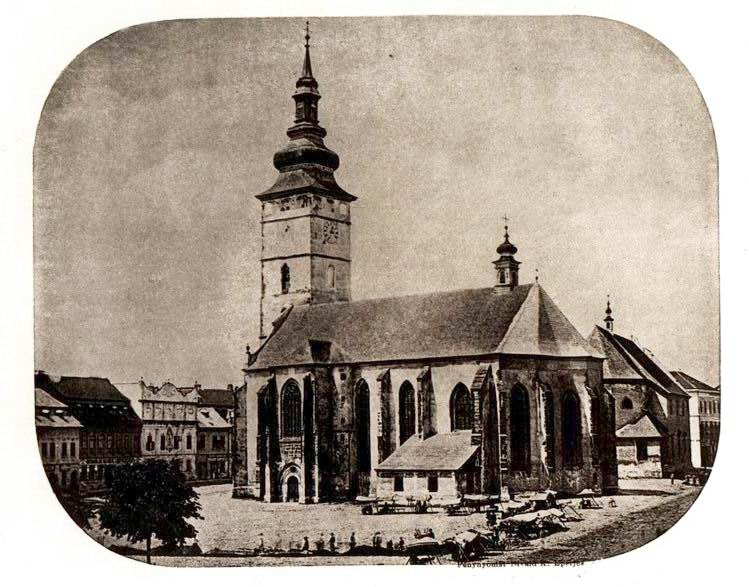
Concathedral in the 18th century with Baroque tower

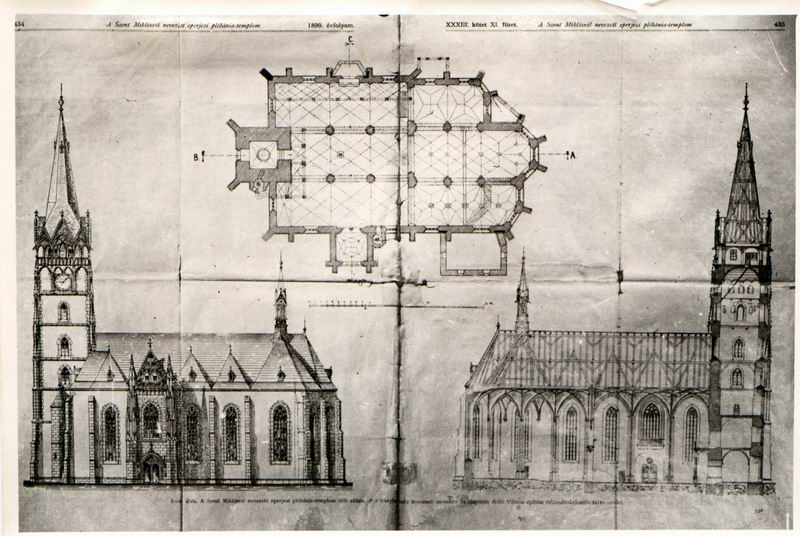
Design and plan of concathedral

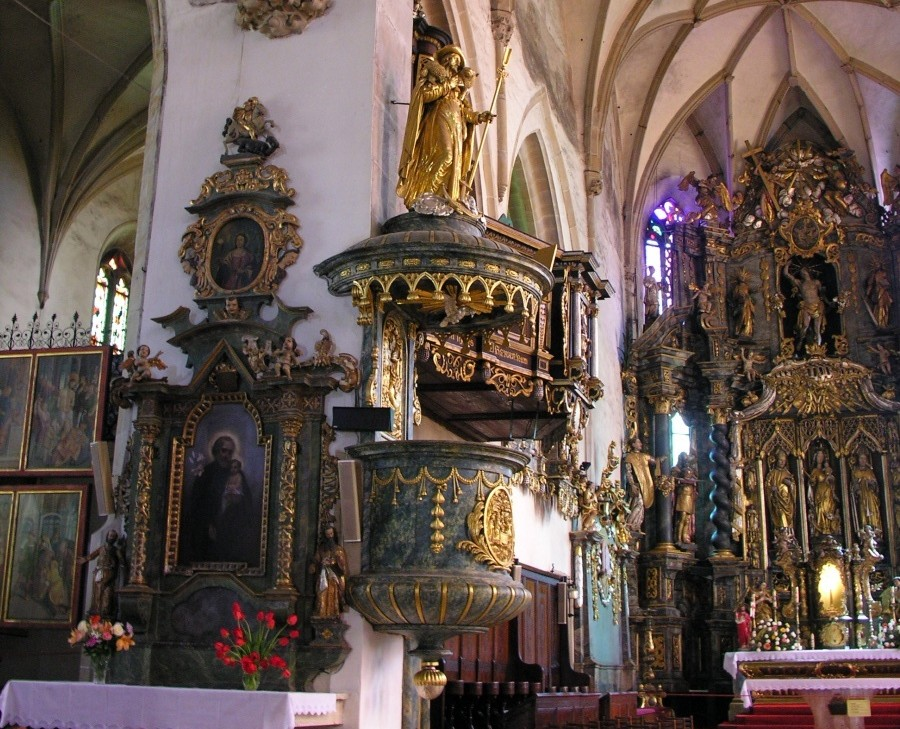
Interior
