= Karetus =

Portuguese musical group

- Origin: Portugal
- Genres: Electronic music
- Years active: 2010-present
- Label: Universal Music Portugal
- Members: Carlos Silva (DJ) (2010-present); André Reis (DJ) (2010-present); Paulo Silva (MC) (2011-present)
- Website: https://www.karetus.com

Karetus is a Portuguese group formed by two DJs and music producers, Carlos Silva, André Reis, one MC, and Paulo Silva, who joined later.

== Discography ==
=== Albums ===
Title	Details
PINÃTA	Released: 3 August 2015; Format: Digital download, CD; Label: Buygore

=== Singles ===
List of singles, with selected details and chart positions
Title	Year	Peak chart positions	Album
Title	Year	POR	Album
"Castles in the Sand" (featuring Agir)	2015	—	PIÑATA
"Wall of Love" (featuring Diogo Piçarra)	2016	65	Non-album singles
"Maluco" (with Wet Bed Gang)	2018	—	Non-album singles
"Não Me Lembro" (with WAZE)	2018	—	Non-album singles
"Bella Ciao" (La Casa de Papel)	2018	—	Non-album singles
"One Nation" (with Bárbara Bandeira and Yuzi)	2018	—	Non-album singles
"Basketball" (with Borgore and Zanova)	2020	—	Non-album singles
"Welele"	2020	—	Non-album singles
"Suruba"	2020	—	Non-album singles
"Saudade" (with Romeu Bairos)	2021	—	Non-album singles
"Squid Game"	2021	—	Non-album singles
"God Save the Bass" (with Holly and Ragga Twins)	2021	—	Non-album singles
"Ave Maria" (with Padre Guilherme and Ricardo Luis Campos)	2022	—	Non-album singles
"Make It Rain" (with Hills Have Eyes)	2022	—	Non-album singles
"Paulada" (with Possessivo)	2022	—	Non-album singles
"Zagadam" (with Ric Fazeres)	2022	—	Non-album singles
"KRAMPUS" (with Anastasiya Ty)	2023	—	Non-album singles
"DE PORTUGAL EU SOU"	2024	—	Non-album singles
"Laurinda" (with Vitorino and Iolanda)	2024	129	Non-album singles
"—" denotes a recording that did not chart or was not released in that territory.
