= Ohradzany =

- Municipality
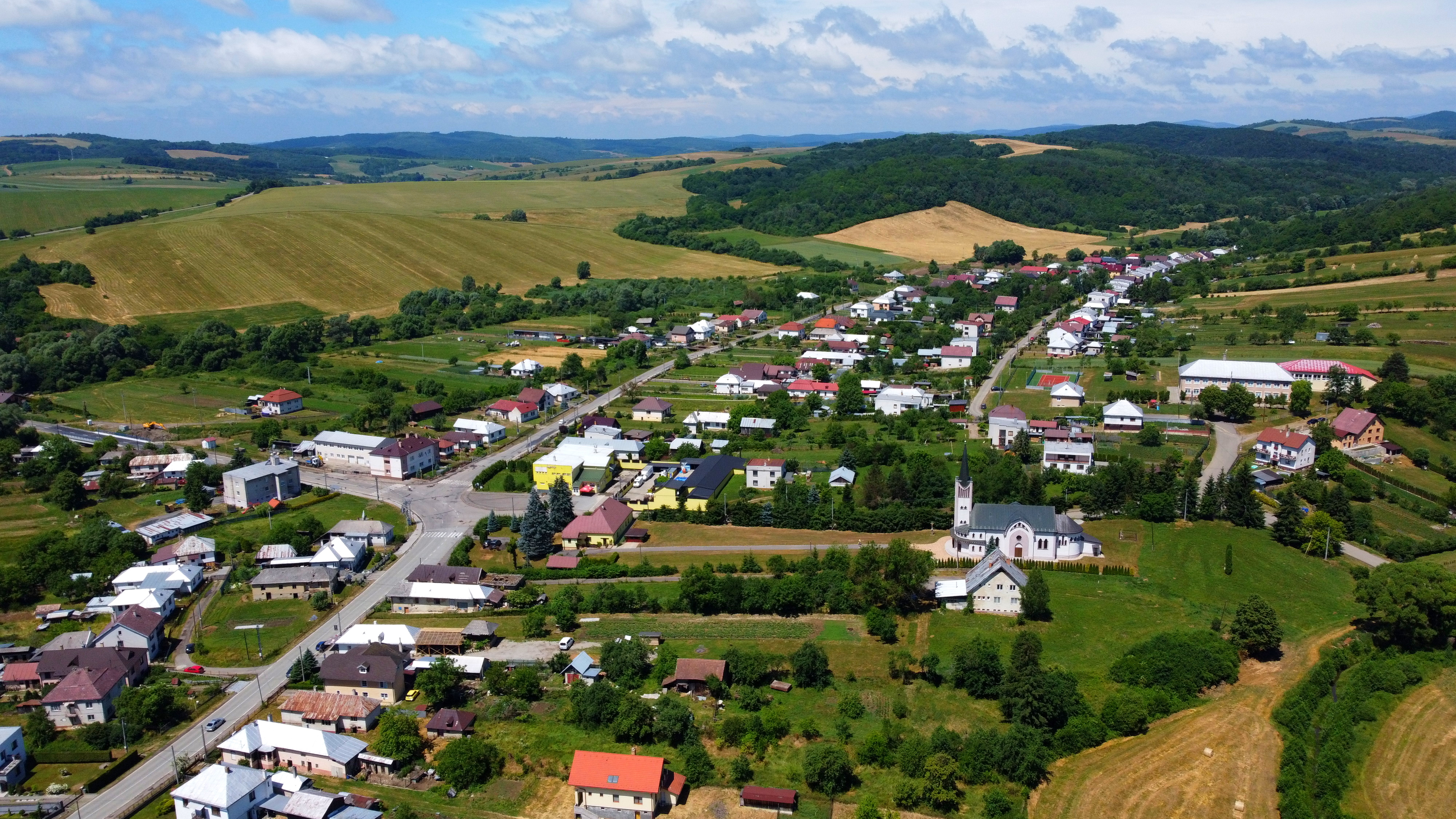

- Flag

- Location of Ohradzany in the Prešov Region Location of Ohradzany in Slovakia
- Coordinates: 49.00°N 21.85°E
- Country: Slovakia
- Region: Prešov Region
- District: Humenné District
- First mentioned: 1317

Area
  - Total: 12.00 km^{2} (4.63 sq mi)
- Elevation: 188 m (617 ft)

Population (2025)
  - Total: 607
- Time zone: UTC+1 (CET)
  - Summer (DST): UTC+2 (CEST)
- Postal code: 672 2
- Area code: +421 57
- Vehicle registration plate (until 2022): HE

Ohradzany is a small village and municipality in Humenné District in the Prešov Region of eastern Slovakia.

== History ==
In historical records the village was first mentioned in 1317. The first archbishop of the Košice Episcopal see, Monsignor Alojz Tkáč, was born here in 1934. the current mayor is Valéria Melníková.

== Geography ==
The municipality lies at an altitude of 188 metres (617 ft) and covers an area of 12.00 km^{2} (4.63 sq mi) (2025).

== Population ==
Population statistic (10 years)
Year	1995	2005	2015	2025
Count	576	629	632	607
Difference		+9.20%	+0.47%	−3.95%

Population statistic
Year	2024	2025
Count	614	607
Difference		−1.14%

It has a population of 607 people (31 December 2025).

=== Ethnicity ===
Census 2021 (1+ %)
Ethnicity	Number	Fraction
Slovak	623	98.73%
Rusyn	17	2.69%
Not found out	15	2.37%
Total	631	

In year 2021 was 631 people by ethnicity 623 as Slovak, 17 as Rusyn, 15 as Not found out, 6 as Czech, 1 as Russian and 1 as English.

Note on population: The difference values of population numbers in the table "Population statistic" and in the sections "Ethnicity" & "Religion" is caused by the use of various statistical methods.

=== Religion ===
Census 2021 (1+ %)
Religion	Number	Fraction
Roman Catholic Church	571	90.49%
Greek Catholic Church	25	3.96%
None	25	3.96%
Total	631	

In year 2021 was 631 people by religion 571 from Roman Catholic Church, 25 from Greek Catholic Church, 25 from None, 5 from Eastern Orthodox Church, 3 from Not found out, 1 from Paganism and natural spirituality and 1 from Ad hoc movements.
