= Kecerovce =

Village and municipality in Slovakia

Kecerovce Kecer
- Municipality
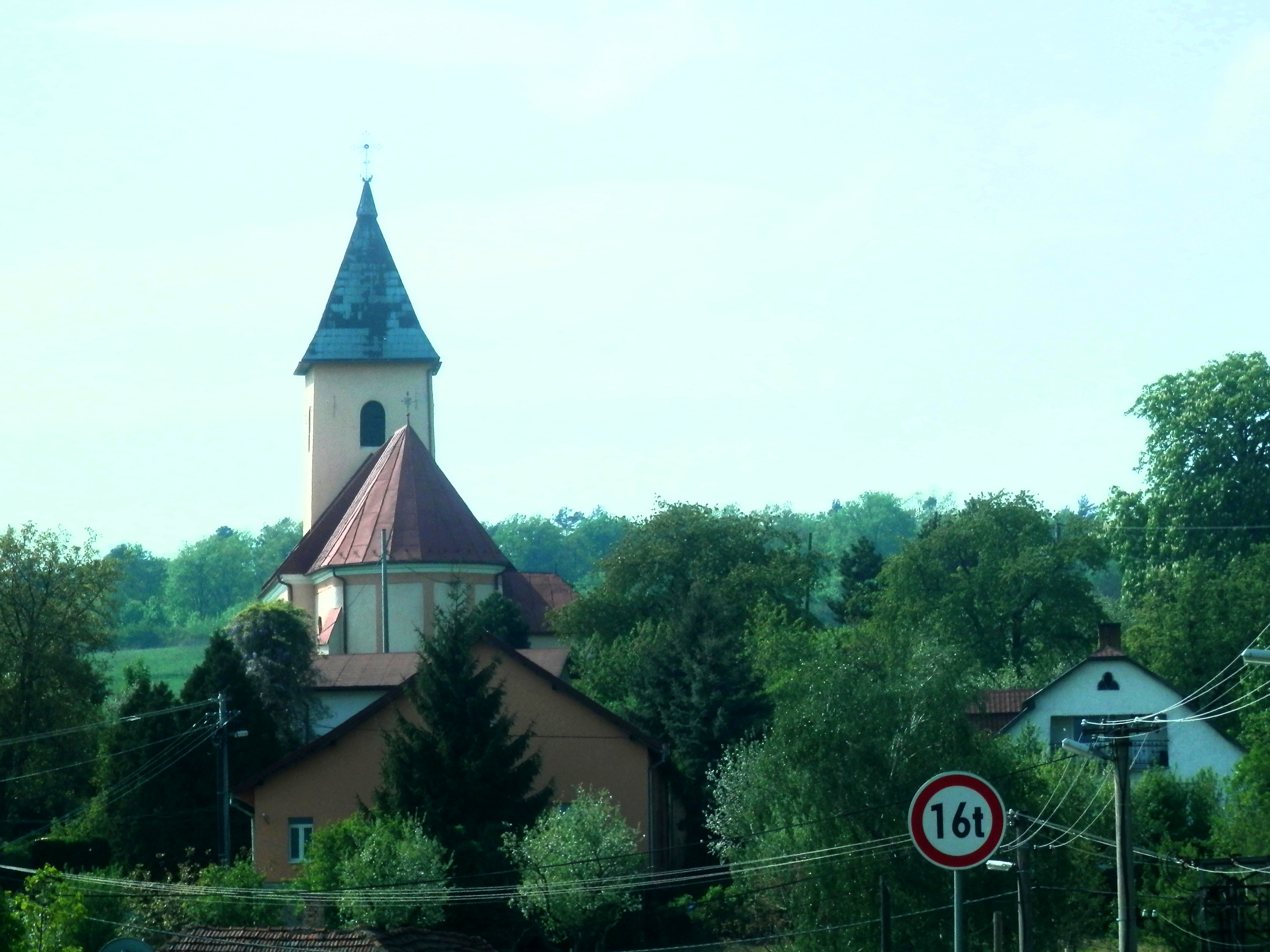

- Flag

- Location of Kecerovce in the Košice Region Location of Kecerovce in Slovakia
- Coordinates: 48.83°N 21.41°E
- Country: Slovakia
- Region: Košice Region
- District: Košice-okolie District
- First mentioned: 1567

Area
  - Total: 13.80 km^{2} (5.33 sq mi)
- Elevation: 307 m (1,007 ft)

Population (2025)
  - Total: 4,171
- Time zone: UTC+1 (CET)
  - Summer (DST): UTC+2 (CEST)
- Postal code: 444 7
- Area code: +421 55
- Vehicle registration plate (until 2022): KS
- Website: obeckecerovce.sk

Kecerovce (Hungarian: Kecer) is a village and municipality in Košice-okolie District in the Košice Region of eastern Slovakia.

== History ==
Historically, the village was first mentioned in 1567.

== Geography ==
The municipality lies at an altitude of 307 metres (1,007 ft) and covers an area of 13.80 km^{2} (5.33 sq mi) (2025).

Construction of a nuclear power plant is planned in Kecerovce. Slovak government announced that initiation of the construction will depend on success in postponing of closure of the oldest Slovak nuclear plant in Jaslovské Bohunice.

== Population ==
Population statistic (10 years)
Year	1995	2005	2015	2025
Count	1969	2659	3329	4171
Difference		+35.04%	+25.19%	+25.29%

Population statistic
Year	2024	2025
Count	4076	4171
Difference		+2.33%

It has a population of 4171 people (31 December 2025).

=== Ethnicity ===
Census 2021 (1+%)
Ethnicity	Number	Fraction
Slovak	2490	65.62%
Romani	1394	36.74%
Not found out	270	7.11%
Total	3794	

In year 2021 was 3794 people by ethnicity 2490 as Slovak, 1394 as Romani, 270 as Not found out, 3 as Czech, 3 as Other, 1 as Rusyn, 1 as Polish and 1 as Moravian.

Note on population: The difference values of population numbers in the table "Population statistic" and in the sections "Ethnicity" & "Religion" is caused by the use of various statistical methods.

The vast majority of the municipality's population consists of the local Roma community. In 2019, they constituted an estimated 98% of the local population.

=== Religion ===
Census 2021 (1+%)
Religion	Number	Fraction
Roman Catholic Church	2485	65.5%
None	776	20.45%
Not found out	207	5.46%
Evangelical Church	132	3.48%
Apostolic Church	77	2.03%
Greek Catholic Church	44	1.16%
Total	3794	

In year 2021 was 3794 people by religion 2485 from Roman Catholic Church, 776 from None, 207 from Not found out, 132 from Evangelical Church, 77 from Apostolic Church, 44 from Greek Catholic Church, 32 from Christian Congregations in Slovakia, 13 from Seventh-day Adventist Church, 10 from Calvinist Church, 5 from Old Catholic Church, 5 from Jehovah's Witnesses, 4 from United Methodist Church, 2 from Eastern Orthodox Church, 1 from Other and not ascertained christian church and 1 from New Apostolic Church.

== Genealogical resources ==
The records for genealogical research are available at the state archive "Statny Archiv in Kosice, Slovakia".

- Roman Catholic church records (births/marriages/deaths): 1755–1895 (parish A)
- Greek Catholic church records (births/marriages/deaths): 1773–1895 (parish B)
- Lutheran church records (births/marriages/deaths): 1784–1895 (parish B)
- Jewish cemetery records also exist

== See also ==
- List of municipalities and towns in Slovakia
