= Archdiocese of Košice =

Roman Catholic archdiocese in Slovakia

Coordinates: 48.7203°N 21.2582°E

Metropolitan Archdiocese of Košice Archidioecesis Metropolitae Cassoviensis Košická Arcidiecéza Metropolitna

Catholic
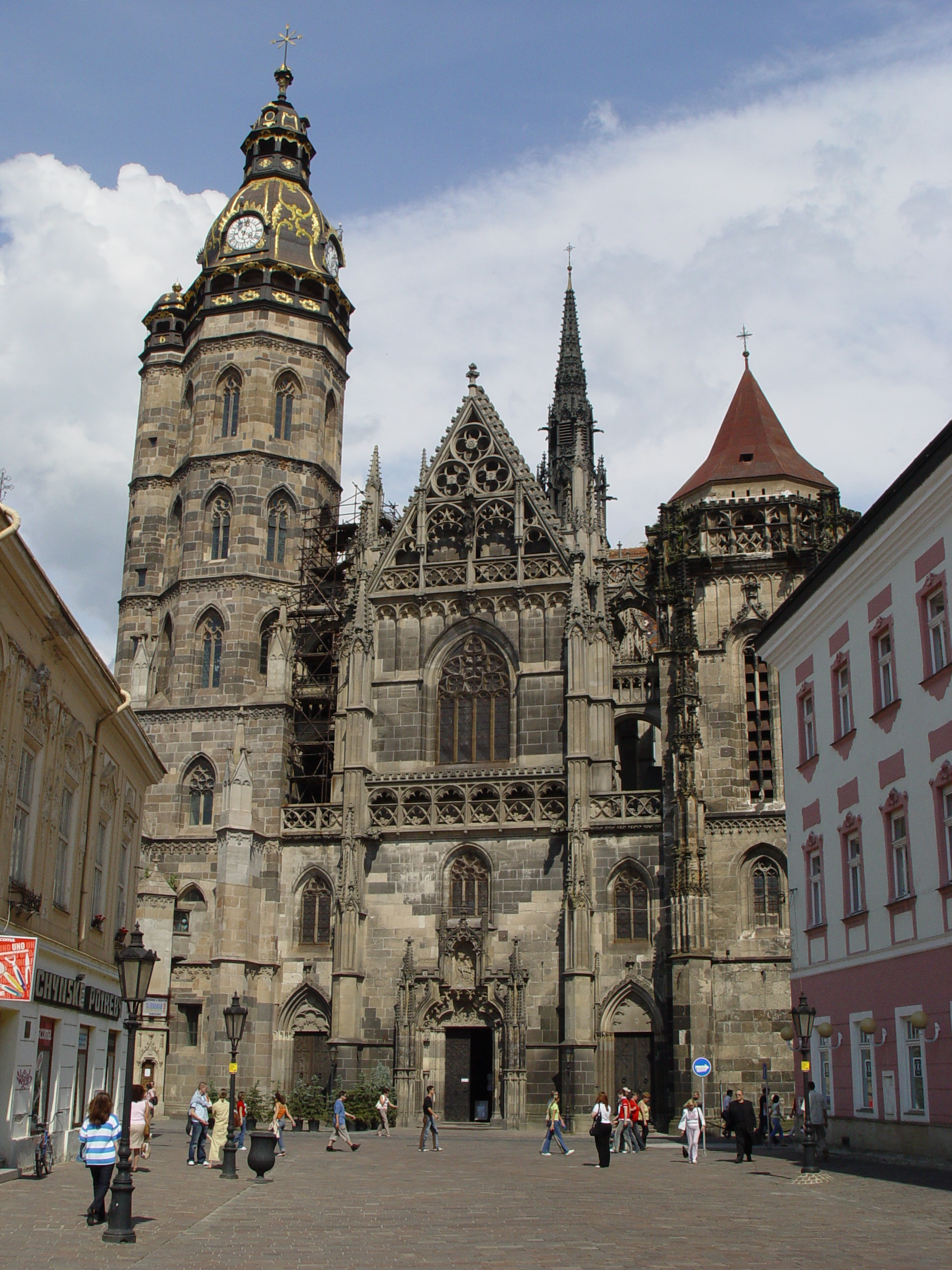
- Cathedral of St. Elizabeth in Košice

- Archdiocese of Košice Coat of Arms

Location
- Country: Slovakia
- Ecclesiastical province: Košice
- Metropolitan: Marek Forgáč (designated)
- Archdeaconries: 3 (Abov - Cathedral, Šariš, Zemplín
- Deaneries: 20

Statistics
- Area: 10,403 km^{2} (4,017 sq mi)
- Population: Total; Catholics: (as of 2020); 1,153,008; ▼522,008 (▼45.3%)
- Parishes: 216
- Churches: 592
- Schools: 39

Information
- Denomination: Roman Catholic
- Sui iuris church: Latin Church
- Rite: Latin Rite
- Established: 10 August 1804 (As Diocese of Košice); 31 March 1995 (As Archdiocese of Košice)
- Cathedral: Cathedral of St. Elizabeth in Košice
- Co-cathedral: Saint Nicholas Concathedral
- Patron saint: Andrew the Apostle
- Secular priests: 430

Current leadership
- Pope: Leo XIV
- Metropolitan Archbishop: Marek Forgáč (designated)
- Suffragans: Diocese of Rožňava, Diocese of Spiš
- Episcopal Vicars: Zoltán Pásztor, Vladimír Šosták
- Bishops emeritus: Bernard Bober

Map
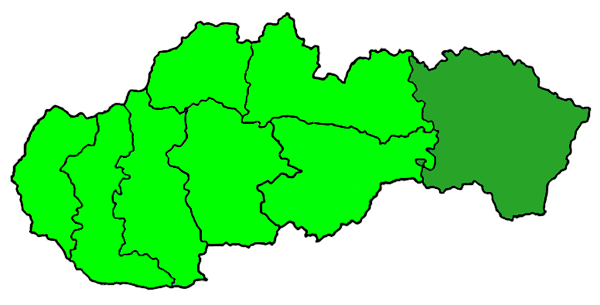
- Map of the Archdiocese

Website
- Website

The Metropolitan Archdiocese of Košice (Slovak: Košická Arcidiecéza Metropolitna, Latin: Archidioecesis Metropolitae Cassoviensis) is a Latin archdiocese of the Catholic Church in eastern Slovakia, with its seat in Košice. It covers the central and eastern parts of the Prešov and Košice regions, with an area of 10,403 km^{2}. The diocese's area has a total population of 1,153,505 people, of which around 61% were of Catholic faith as of 2012. The Cathedral of St. Elizabeth serves as the seat of the diocese.

The late Metropolitan Archbishop, Bernard Bober was appointed on June 4, 2010, and canonically took power of the archdiocese on July 10, 2010. He had formerly served as auxiliary bishop under Alojz Tkáč. On June 11, 2014, priest Marek Forgáč was appointed as the new auxiliary bishop by Pope Francis.

== History ==
It was first created in 1804 under name Diocese of Košice as a suffragan to the Archdiocese of Eger.

Owing to strained relations between the Vatican and Czechoslovakia, the diocese remained vacant from 1925 to 1990, under apostolic administrators, except for the period between 1939 and 1945, when it was governed by a residential bishop following the return (1938–1945) of the territory to Hungarian rule (after the First Vienna Award).

In 1977, the metropolitan was changed to the newly established ecclesiastical province of Trnava. On 31 March 1995, a new ecclesiastical province was created, changing the status of the diocese into archdiocese with the suffragans of Spiš and Rožňava.

St Charles Borromeo Seminary, the diocese's main seminary, was founded in 1994.

== See also ==
- List of archbishops of Košice
