= Alojz Tkáč =

Slovak Roman Catholic prelate (1934–2023)

His Excellency Alojz Tkáč
- Archbishop Emeritus of Košice
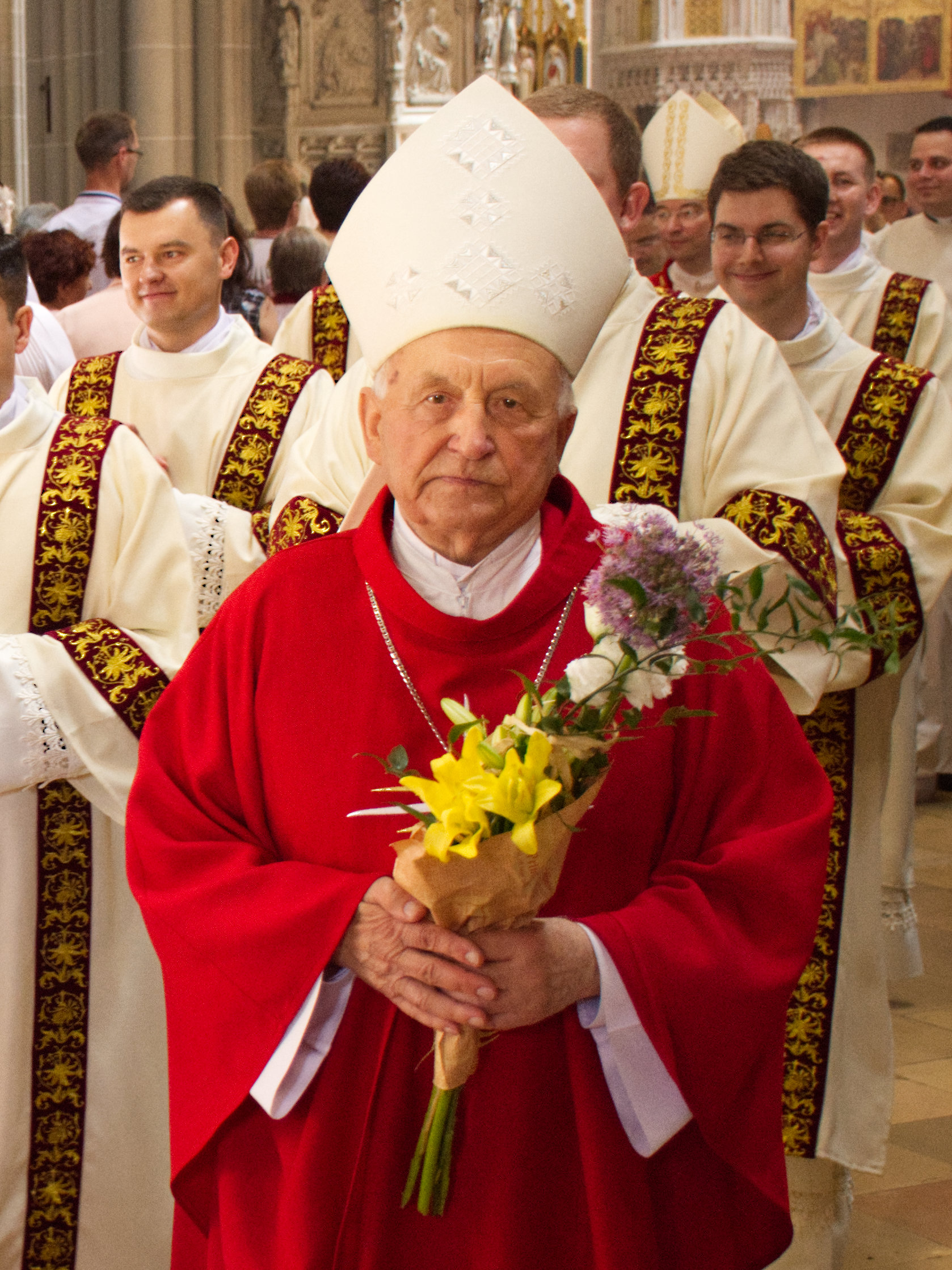
- Tkáč in 2019
- Church: Roman Catholic
- Appointed: 31 March 1995
- Term ended: 4 June 2010
- Predecessor: Position established
- Successor: Bernard Bober
- Previous post: Bishop of Košice (1990–1995)

Orders
- Ordination: 25 June 1961 by Ambróz Lazík
- Consecration: 17 February 1990 by Jozef Tomko

Personal details
- Born: 2 March 1934 Ohradzany, Czechoslovakia
- Died: 23 May 2023 (aged 89) Košice, Slovakia
- Buried: Cathedral of St. Elizabeth
- Education: Comenius University
- Motto: Praedicare, regere, sanctificare (Latin for 'To announce, to govern, to sanctify')
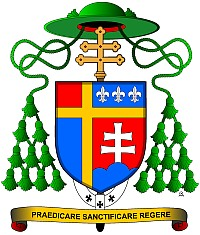
- Coat of arms

Styles of Alojz Tkáč
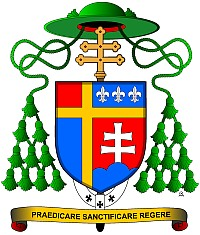
- Reference style: His Excellency; The Most Reverend
- Spoken style: Your Excellency
- Religious style: Archbishop

Monsignor Alojz Tkáč (2 March 1934 – 23 May 2023) was a Slovak Roman Catholic prelate. He was the bishop of Košice from 1990 to 1995, the first archbishop of the Roman Catholic Archdiocese of Košice from 1995 to 2010 and archbishop emeritus until his death.

== Early life ==
Tkáč was born in the village of Ohradzany to a religious farming family. His father was the mayor of the village. He wanted to become a priest since childhood. Following education at a Grammar School in Humenné, he applied to study theology at the Comenius University, where he was accepted in 1956 after being turned down three times.

== Church career ==
=== Priesthood and persecution ===
Tkáč was consecrated in 1961 by the Bishop of Trnava Ambróz Lazík. Following the mandatory military service, Tkáč worked in the archive of the Košice Diocese.

On 23 October 1974 Tkáč criticized the state of the church at an internal meeting. His speech was broadcast by Vatican Radio and Radio Free Europe. The Communist regime punished Tkáč by withdrawing state consent for Tkáč to preach. As a result, Tkáč made a living as a tram driver and lumberjack.

In 1983, following a temporary improvement of the relationship between the Church and the regime, Tkáč was again granted permission to work as a priest and was assigned to the parish in the Červenica village.

=== Bishop and archbishop of Košice ===
Following the Velvet Revolution, Pope John Paul II assigned Tkáč to the role of Bishop of Košice, which had been vacant since the death of Jozef Čársky in 1962 due to the resistance of the Communist regime to the appointment of a new bishop.

In 1995 the Košice Diocese was promoted to archdiocese, with Tkáč becoming its first archbishop. As archbishop he opened a new house for priests in Veľký Šariš, renovated the seminary in Košice, established new parishes and presided over the construction of 80 new churches. He was also instrumental in the establishment of a Carmelite monastery at Sídlisko KVP.

In 1997, he defended Jozef Tiso, the fascist president of World War II-era Slovak Republic (1939–1945) and relativized his role in the Holocaust, claiming that "rich and powerful" Jews living overseas did not do enough to save the European Jews.

In 2009 Tkáč reached the age of 75 and, following canonical law, submitted his resignation to Pope Benedict XVI, who accepted it in 2010. Tkáč was replaced by Bernard Bober, who had been his auxiliary bishop since 1992. Tkáč continued to assist Bober in the capacity of an archbishop emeritus until his death on 23 May 2023.

== Personal life and death ==
Tkáč donated blood more than hundred times. He financially supported the education of children in Asia and Africa.

Tkáč died on 23 May 2023, at the age of 89. He is buried in the crypt under the Cathedral of St. Elizabeth.

Catholic Church titles
Preceded by Position established	Archbishop of Košice; 1995–2010	Succeeded by Bernard Bober
Preceded by Jozef Čársky (until 1962); Sede vacante (1962–1990)	Bishop of Košice; 1990–1995	Succeeded by Position abolished
