= Catholic University in Ružomberok =

University in Slovakia

Coordinates: 49.0830°N 19.2809°E

- Katolícka univerzita v Ružomberku
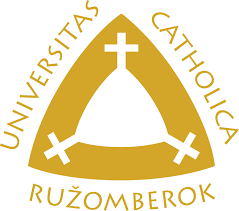
- Other names: KU
- Type: Public
- Established: 2000
- Affiliations: ERASMUS/ IFCU, FUCE
- Rector: Doc. Ing. Jaroslav Demko
- Students: c. 4100
- Location: Hrabovská cesta 1/A, 034 01, Ružomberok, Slovakia
- Website: www.ku.sk

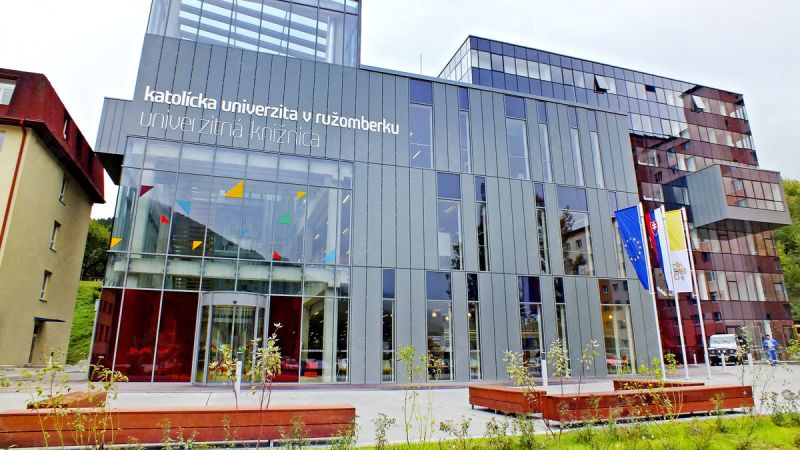
Library and main building of Catholic University in Ruzomberok

Catholic University in Ružomberok (CU) is a public university with religious character. The Conference of Slovak Bishops and National Council of the Slovak Republic took part in its foundation in 2000. CU performs its activities especially in the areas of the humanities, historical, pedagogical, and social and health sciences, as well as in the areas of art, economics, management, and law. Catholic University has been the associate since 2004 and in 2010, it became the member of International Federation of Catholic Universities. University has also been the member of Fédération des Universités Catholiques Européennes (FUCE) since 2007. Since 2016 vice-rector prof. František Trstenský is member of Board of FUCE.

== Structure ==
Catholic University has four faculties:

- Faculty of Theology (in Košice)
- Faculty of Arts and Letters
- Faculty of Education
- Faculty of Health
