= Jacob Hoel =

Norwegian farmer, officer, and politician

Jacob Nilsen Hoel (7 August 1775 – 29 July 1847) was a Norwegian farmer, officer and politician.
