= East Slovak Museum =

Museum in Košice, Slovakia

Coordinates: 48°43′38″N 21°15′12″E

The East Slovak Museum
- Východoslovenské múzeum
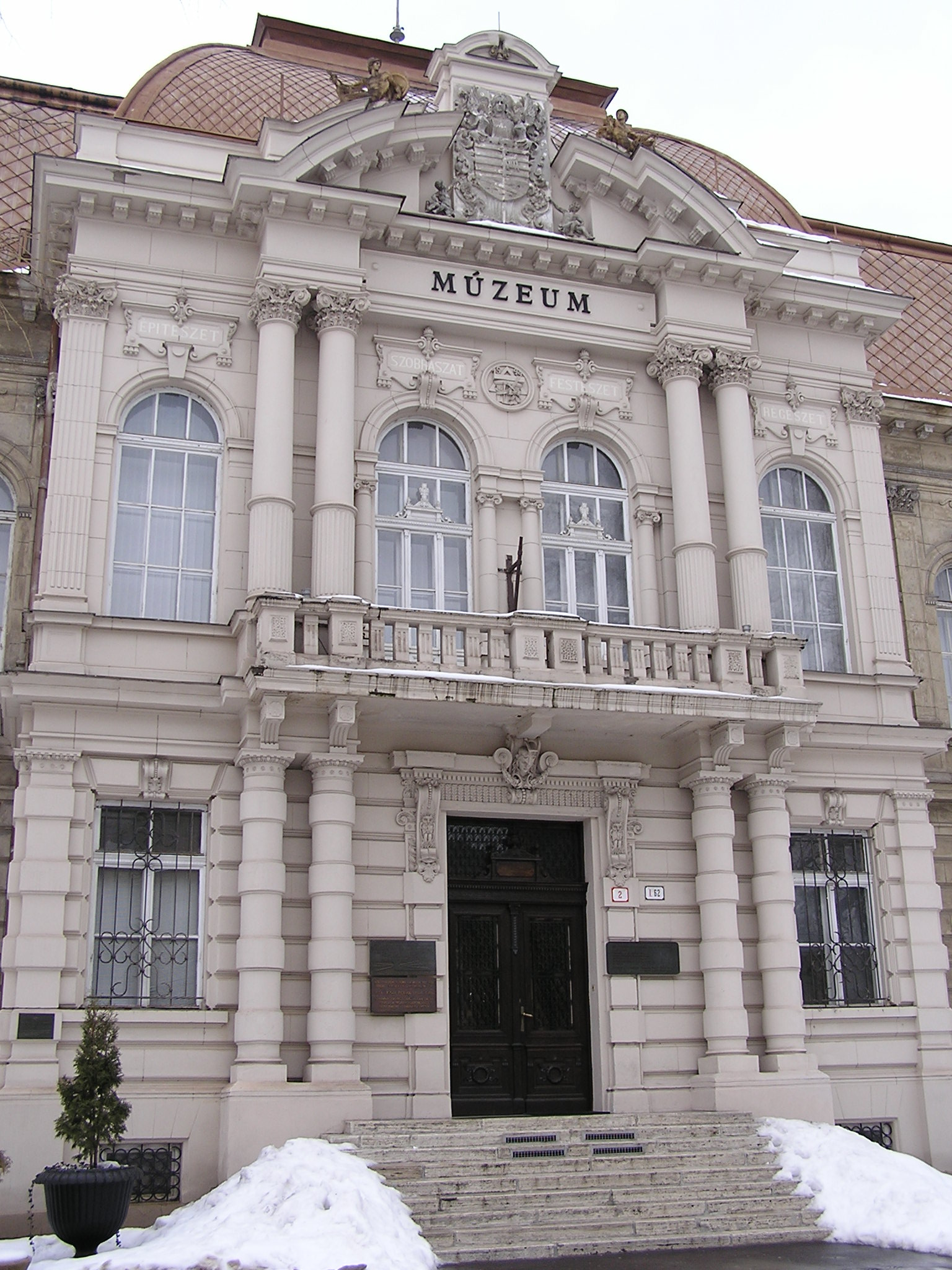
- Established: 1872
- Location: Košice, Slovakia
- Collection size: 500,000
- Website: www.vsmuzeum.sk

The East Slovak Museum (Slovak: Východoslovenské múzeum) in Košice, Slovakia, is one of the oldest Slovak museums, founded in 1872. It is located in the Old Town borough of Košice, at Námestie Maratónu mieru (Peace Marathon Square).

The museum was founded on 25 June 1876 as Felső-Magyarországi Muzeum (Museum of Upper Hungary), in the Kingdom of Hungary. In 1906, it was renamed to Felső-magyarországi Rákóczi Múzeum after the reburial of Francis II Rákóczi.

A neo-Renaissance building was erected in the early 20th century. It was the first building in the city designed to serve its needs as a museum. There are sculptures of Perseus and Vulcan on the facade of the building.

The museum also possesses a relocated wooden church that was built in 1741.

== Exhibitions ==
The main museum building is located at Peace Marathon Square in central Košice, just outside the Old Town's traditional northern boundary. It serves as the headquarters of the institution, housing several permanent exhibitions. It also features a number of exhibition spaces for temporary exhibitions pertaining to history, archaeology, fine arts, historical photography, biology and nature, and other related topics. Temporary exhibitions in the museum tend to last several weeks or even months.

The current number of permanent exhibitions in the main museum underwent a general overhaul in the early-to-mid 2010s, during the main museum building's biggest maintenance renovation in its history. The renovation lasted from September 2008 to September 2013.

In addition to the main museum building, the museum has further branch exhibits in other parts of the Old Town borough, such as the permanent exhibits on nearby Hviezdoslavova Street, the permanent exhibits on Pri Miklušovej väznici and Stará Baštová streets, the specialised exhibition spaces on Hrnčiarska Street, and others.

The following sections provide an overview of the museum's main exhibits, both current and former.

=== Current exhibitions ===
Permanent exhibitions and exhibition spaces currently operated by the museum.

Image	Exhibit name	Type	Contents	Location	Notes
	Experience Gothic (Zaži gotiku)	Permanent exhibition	Art history, historical artistic artefacts (religious as well as secular), fine arts, applied arts and period living during the Gothic era of Slovakia and central Europe.	Námestie Maratónu mieru 2	Permanent exhibition in the main museum building, on Gothic era art history, crafts and material culture, and period living. First opened on the 2nd of February 2024.
	Salon Renaissance	Permanent exhibition	Art history, historical artistic artefacts (religious as well as secular), fine arts, applied arts and period living during the Renaissance era of Slovakia and central Europe.	Námestie Maratónu mieru 2	Permanent exhibition in the main museum building, on Renaissance era art history, crafts and material culture, and period living. First opened on the 27th of September 2023.
	Experience Baroque (Zaži barok)	Permanent exhibit	Art history, historical artistic artefacts (religious as well as secular), fine arts, applied arts and period living during the Baroque era of Slovakia and central Europe.	Námestie Maratónu mieru 2	Permanent exhibit in the main museum building, on Baroque era art history, crafts and material culture, and period living. First opened on the 14th of October 2022.
	Treasure Journey (Cesta za pokladom)	Permanent exhibition	Late-medieval and early modern treasure of golden coins and golden jewellery, excavated in the 1930s. Includes period coins from Hungary and many countries from all around Europe, as well as covering the discoveries of smaller coin hoards elsewhere in east Slovakia (e.g. the Levoča coin hoard, the Obišovce copper coin hoard). Also features exhibit rooms with a detailed overview of the history of mining for precious ores and minting coins in Slovakia and central Europe, throughout the centuries.	Námestie Maratónu mieru 2	The main part of the exhibition, the Košice Golden Treasure, is a 15th and early 16th century coins and valuables archaeological hoard, discovered in the city in August 1935. This permanent exhibit has a long tradition in the museum. This latest iteration opened on the 14th of December 2024, and is an expansion and update of the initial 2010s modernization of the Košice Golden Treasure permanent exhibition.
	Wooden church of St. Nicholas from Kožuchovce	Permanent exhibit	East Carpathian wooden church and wooden belfry, originally from the village of Kožuchovce in Slovakia and from the village of Mineralnoye in Zakarpattia Oblast in Ukraine, respectively. The church was built in 1741.	Námestie Maratónu mieru 2	Transferred to Košice in the 20th century. Located in the park on the grounds of the main building.
	The Threads of Life (Nitky života)	Permanent exhibition	Social history and period living exhibit, including the history of material culture, clothing, housing and pharmacy. Focused mainly on east Slovakia.	Hviezdoslavova 3	Branch exhibit on Hviezdoslavova Street.
	The Nature of the Carpathians (Príroda Karpát)	Permanent exhibition	Natural history exhibit, geology, paleontology and zoology collections. Focused mainly on the Slovak Carpathians and east Slovakia.	Hviezdoslavova 3	Branch exhibit on Hviezdoslavova Street.
	The Košice Centuries (Košické storočia)	Permanent exhibition	Medieval and early modern history of the city.	Pri Miklušovej väznici 10	Branch exhibit on Pri Miklušovej väznici Street. Located inside Mikluš's Prison, an old city prison derived from two medieval townhouses.
	Medieval Fortifications of the City of Košice - Casemate	Permanent exhibition	Medieval and early modern fortifications of Košice.	Hrnčiarska 7	Branch exhibit on Hrnčiarska Street. Housed mostly in the Executioner's Bastion.
	Rodošto - Memorial House of Francis II. Rákóczi	Permanent exhibition	Replica of the house in which Francis II Rákóczi lived during his years in Ottoman exile (1720–1735).	Hrnčiarska 7	Branch exhibit on Hrnčiarska Street. The exhibit was updated in 2013.
	The House of Crafts (Dom remesiel)	Exhibition space	Intended for longer-lasting temporary exhibitions on Košice's history of crafts and industries.	Hrnčiarska 9/A	Branch exhibit on Hrnčiarska Street. The latest branch exhibition space, opened in 2013.

=== Former exhibitions ===
Major exhibitions and exhibition spaces operated by the museum in the past. No longer in existence, administered by different museums in the present or developed into separate museums. Listed in rough chronological order, based on date of founding.

Image	Exhibit name	Type	Contents	Location and duration	Notes
	First historical exhibit at the Červený Kláštor monastery	Permanent exhibit	An exhibit focused on the history of the monastery, including its role in pharmacy history and research. The first exhibit of its kind in Červený Kláštor.	Červený Kláštor monastery in Červený Kláštor From 1966 until ca the 1980s.	Established in 1966 as the first museum exhibit on the monastic and research history of the monastery. The Červený Kláštor exhibit was later moved under the administration of the Ľubovňa Museum in Stará Ľubovňa (1999–2007), which continued the modernisation and expansion of the exhibits. Most recently, since 2008, the monastery's exhibits were further refurbished, and the whole museum is now administered by the Monuments Board of the Slovak Republic.
	Košice Golden Treasure (Košický zlatý poklad)	Permanent exhibition	Late-medieval and early modern treasure of golden coins and golden jewellery, excavated in the 1930s. Includes period coins from Hungary and many countries from all around Europe.	Námestie Maratónu mieru 2 1970-2008 (1st iteration, 2013-2024 (2nd iteration)	The treasure was discovered in August 1935. This permanent exhibit has a long tradition in the museum, first opened to the public on the 17th of January 1970, and lasting in its original form until September 2008. The post-reconstruction, modernized iteration of the exhibit first opened in the 2010s, and was then expanded, updated and reopened in 2024, reopening in December 2024 under the new title Cesta za pokladom ("Treasure Journey").
	Artistic Metal-founding in East Slovakia (Umelecké kovolejárstvo na východnom Slovensku)	Permanent exhibition	An exhibit focused on the history and aspects of bell-forging, bell-founding and general utilitarian iron-forging, foundry and smithing crafts. The St Urban Tower on the main square was chosen for its connection to the city's famous bell of St Urban.	St Urban Tower; Main Street in Košice 1977–1994	The tower's most recent historical bell, the bell of St Urban, was created in the 17th century and damaged by a fire in 1966. This original bell was eventually restored and displayed in front of the tower by the early 1990s and a replica was developed and installed in the tower itself in 1996, after the cancellation of the exhibit in 1994. Since 2004, the tower was used for the private Wax Museum of Košice, which showed Košice's historical personalities and operated for about a decade.
	The People, Creators of Lasting Values (Ľud, tvorca trvalých hodnôt)	Permanent exhibition	Archaeological history and general history of east Slovakia, from prehistory to the early 20th century, in chronological order.	Námestie Maratónu mieru 2 1981-2008	Former main permanent exhibit in the main museum building at Peace Marathon Square, during the 1980s, 1990s and most of the 2000s. It opened on the 27th of May 1981, underwent certain revisions in later decades, and closed in August 2008, with the start of reconstructions of the main museum building in autumn 2008. After the conclusion of the reconstruction and the reopening of the building in 2013, the rooms and exhibition spaces of the former exhibit were used for various temporary history, art and archeology exhibitions during the 2010s. In the early 2020s, these exhibition spaces were restructured into the three new, current permanent exhibits on art history and material culture, "Experience Gothic", "Salon Renaissance", "Experience Baroque", in the main museum building at Peace Marathon Square.
	Centuries in Art (Storočia v umení)	Permanent exhibition	Art history, historical artistic artefacts (religious as well as secular) and fine arts.	Hviezdoslavova 3 1992 - 2022	Former branch exhibit on Hviezdoslavova Street. Reconfigured into the three new art history permanent exhibits in the main building of the museum at Peace Marathon Square, and replaced with the Nitky života ("The Threads of Life") exhibit at the branch building on Hviezdoslavova Street.

== Gallery ==
Main building (exterior and interior views)

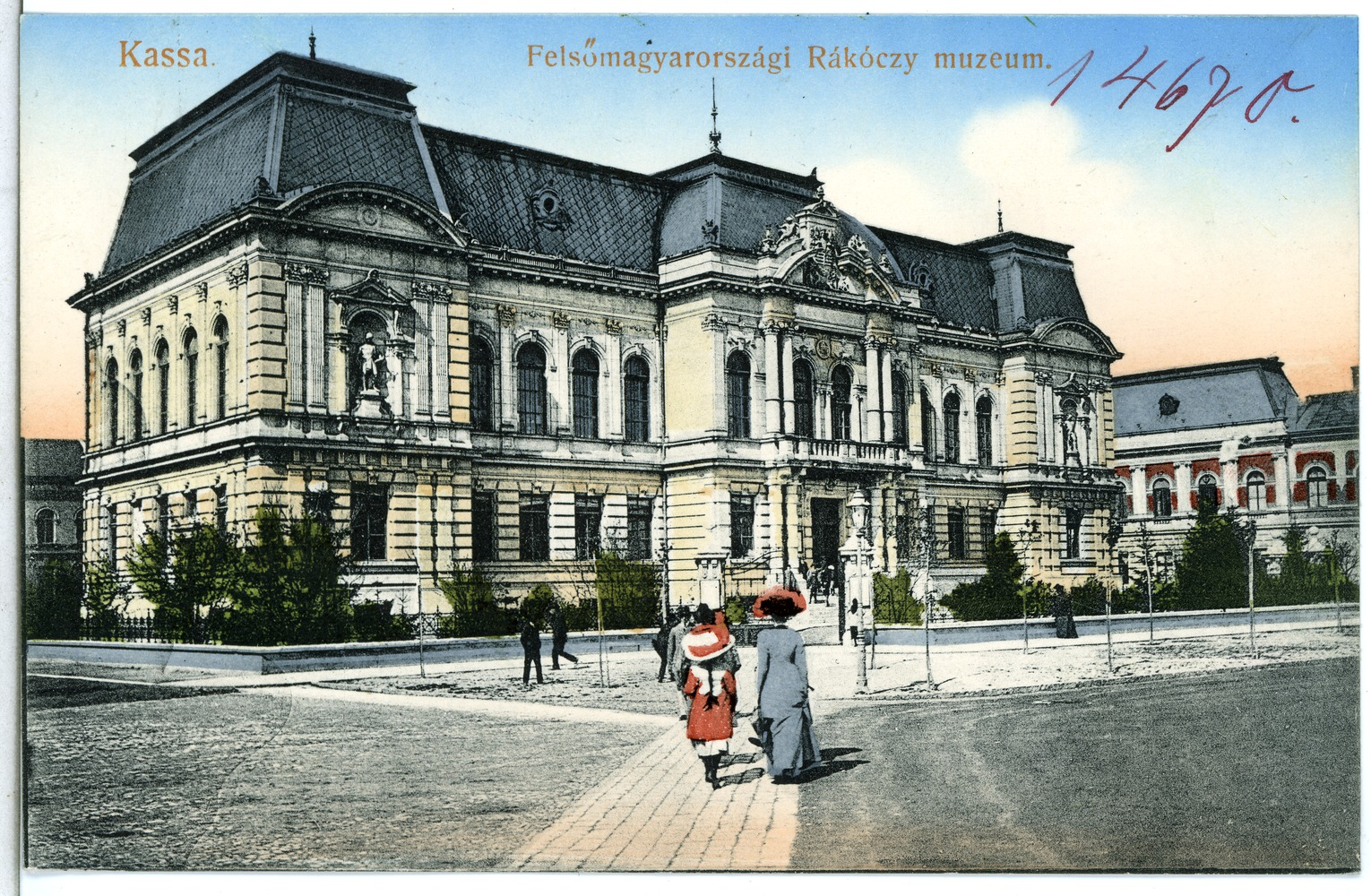
The museum in 1912 (period postcard)

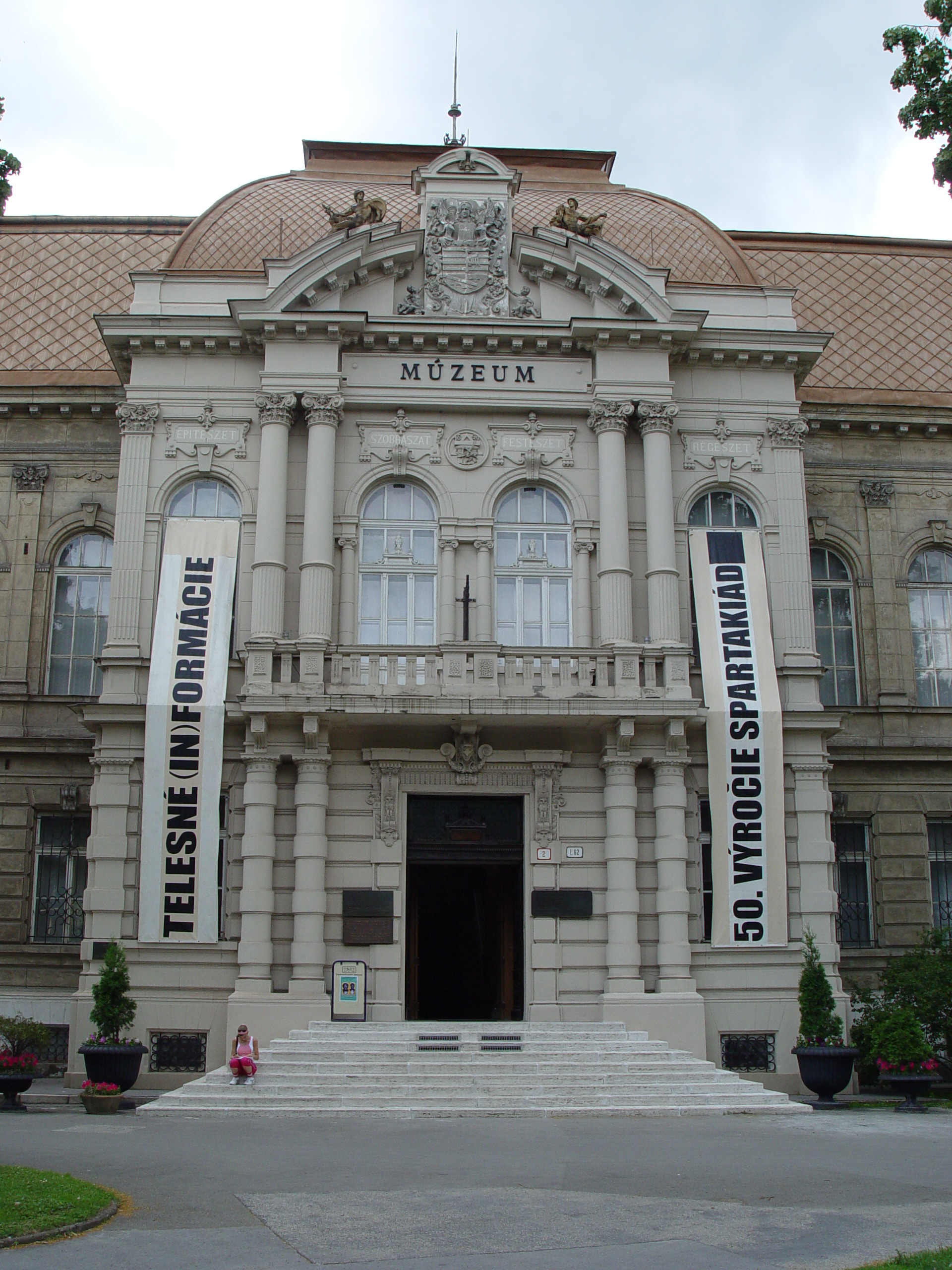
The entrance facade during daytime (2005)

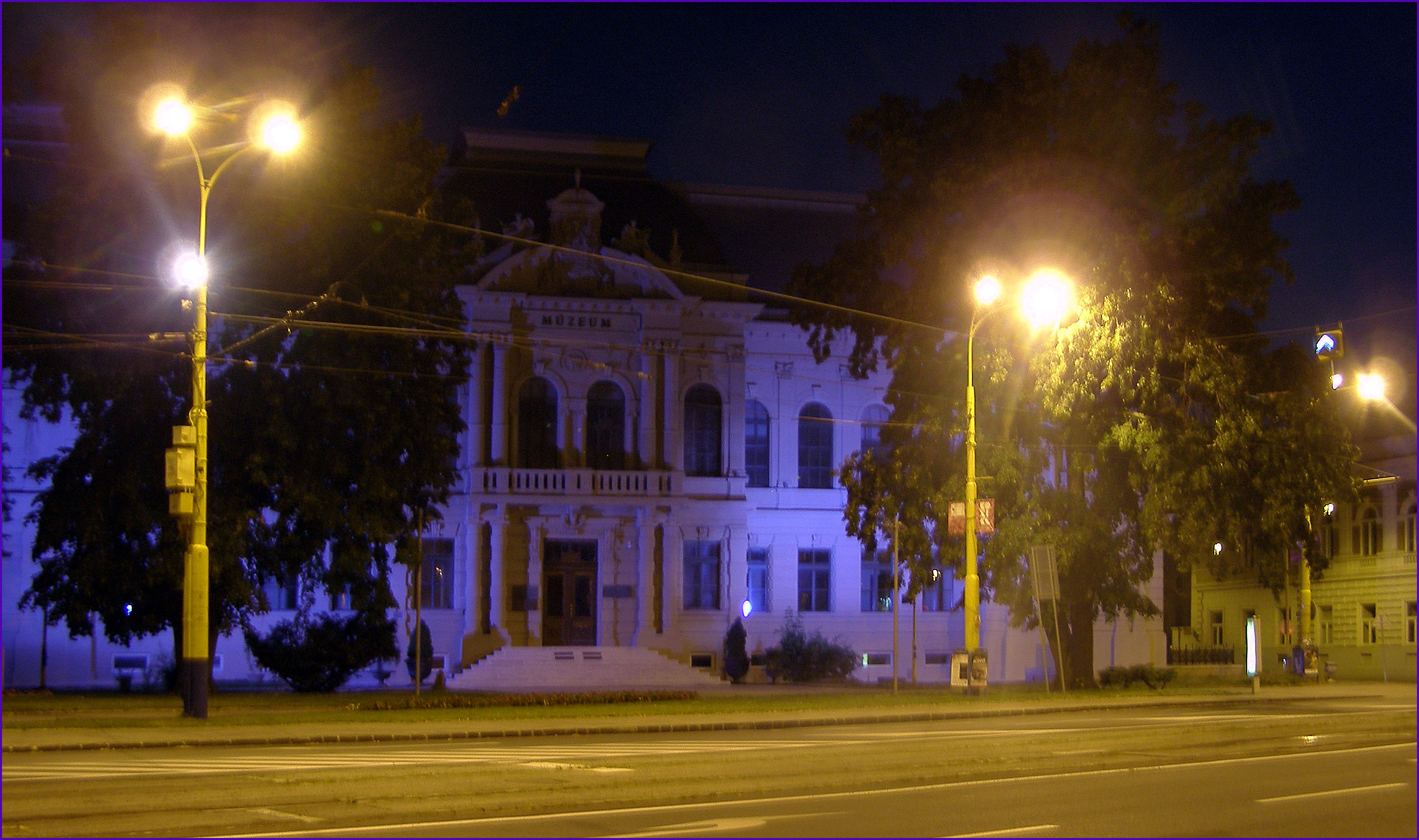
Museum at night time (July 2013)

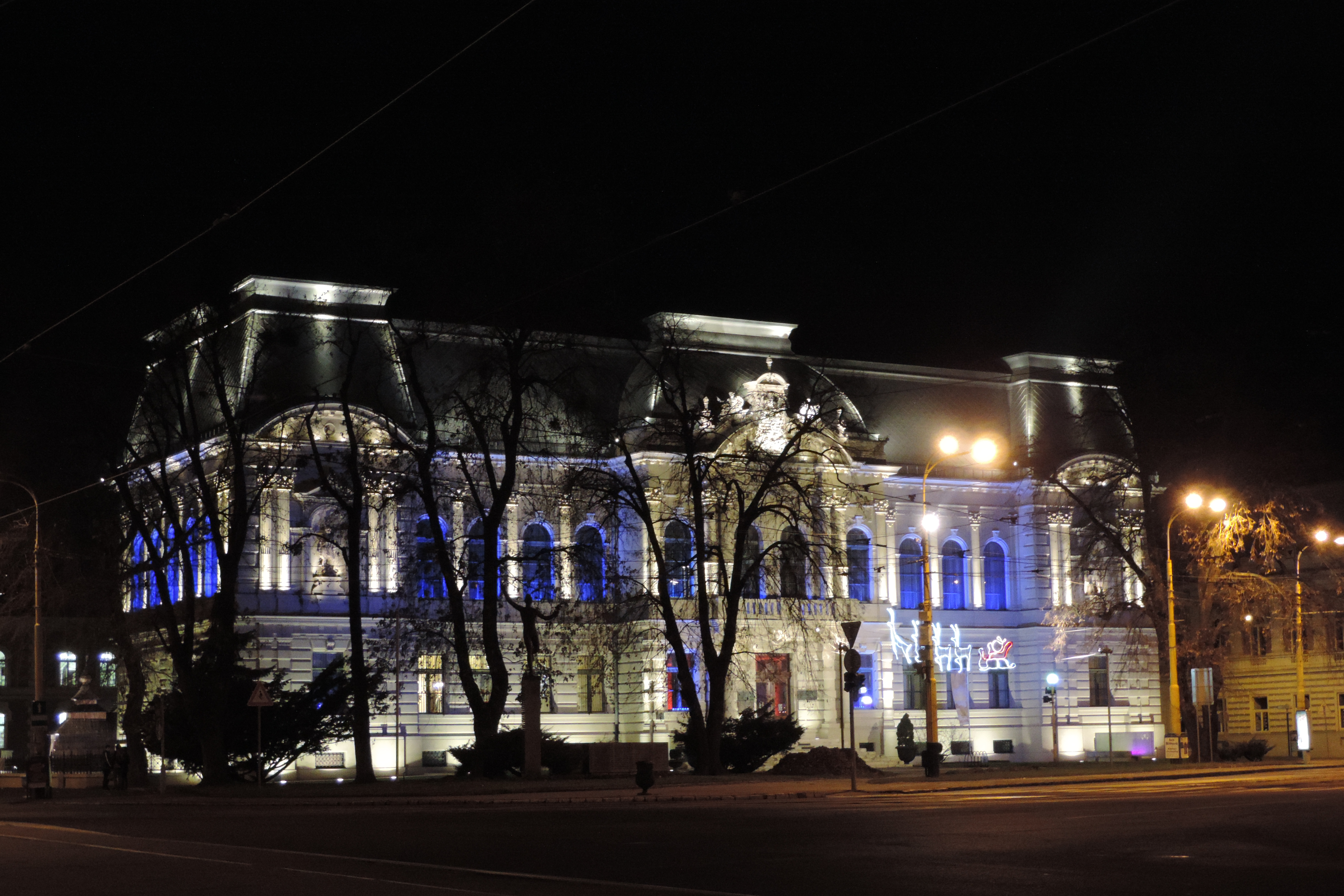
Museum at night time (December 2014)

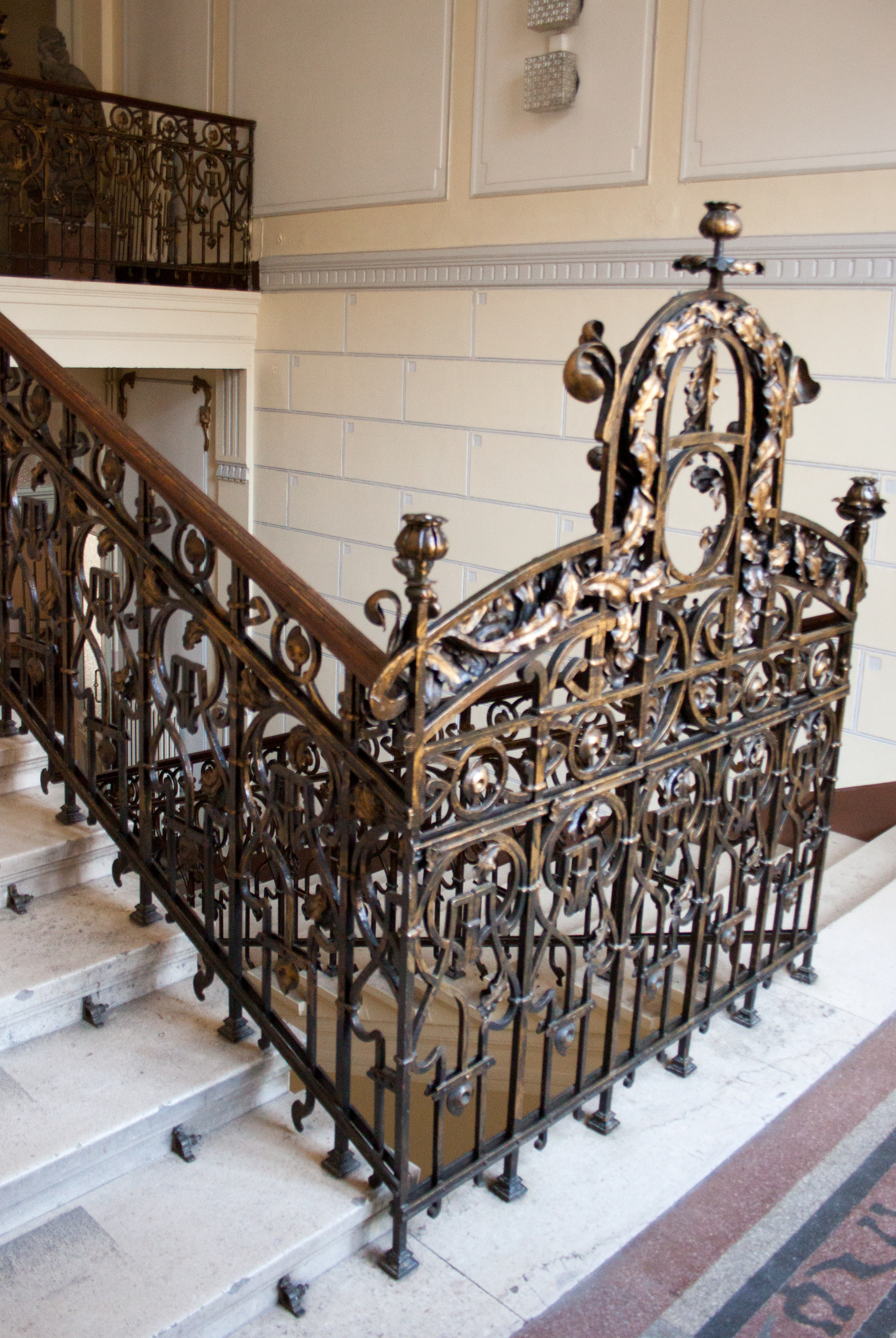
Decorated handrails of the main staircase

Wooden church of St. Nicholas from Kožuchovce and wooden belfry from Transcarpathian Ukraine (museum park)

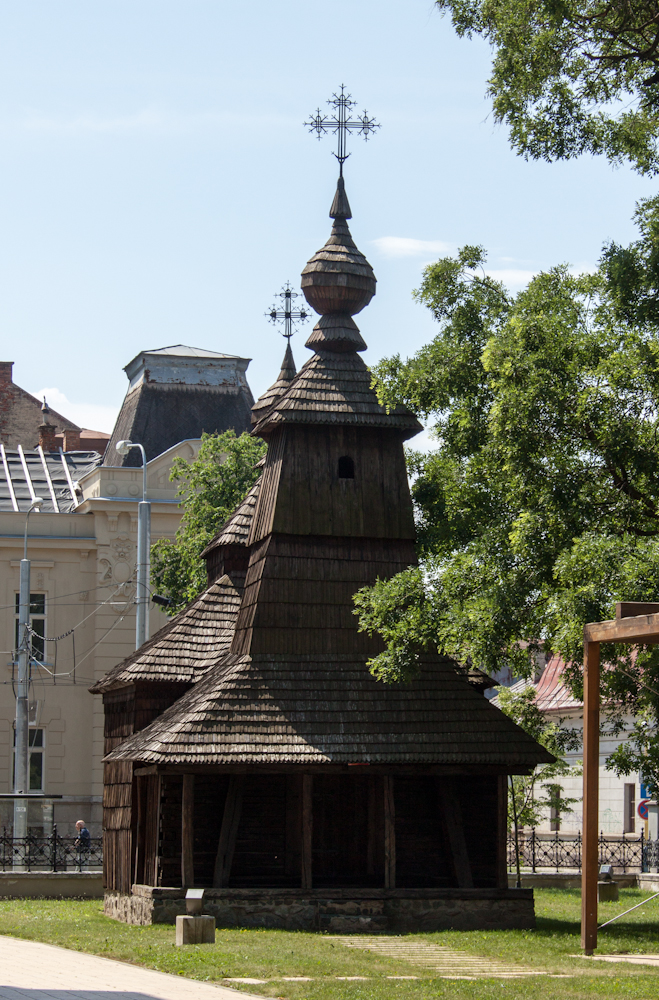
The wooden church of St. Nicholas, originally from Kožuchovce

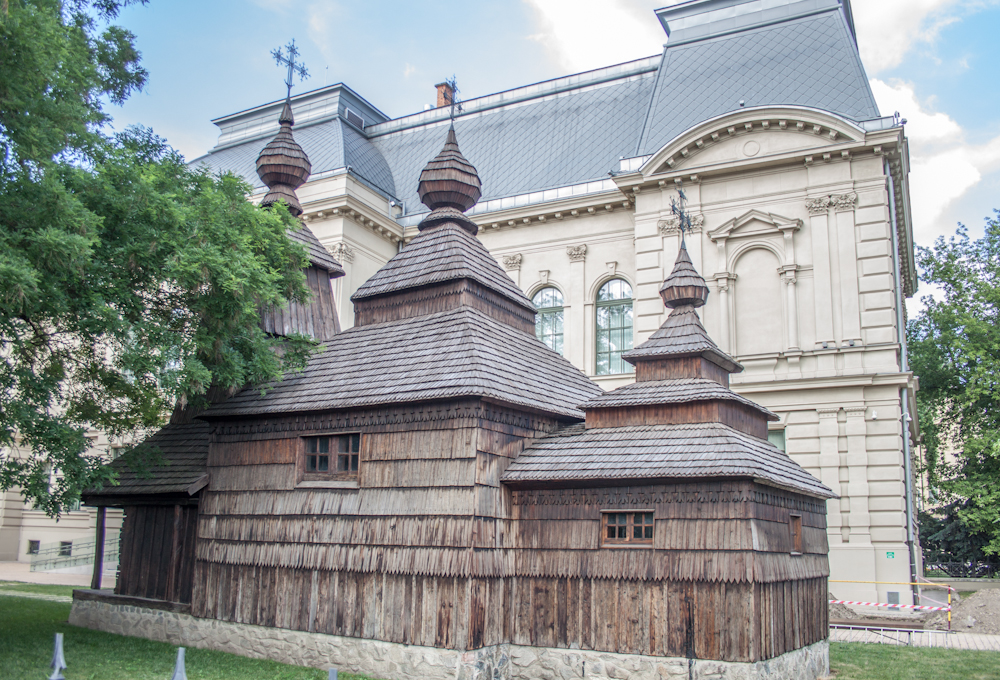
The wooden church of St. Nicholas, originally from Kožuchovce

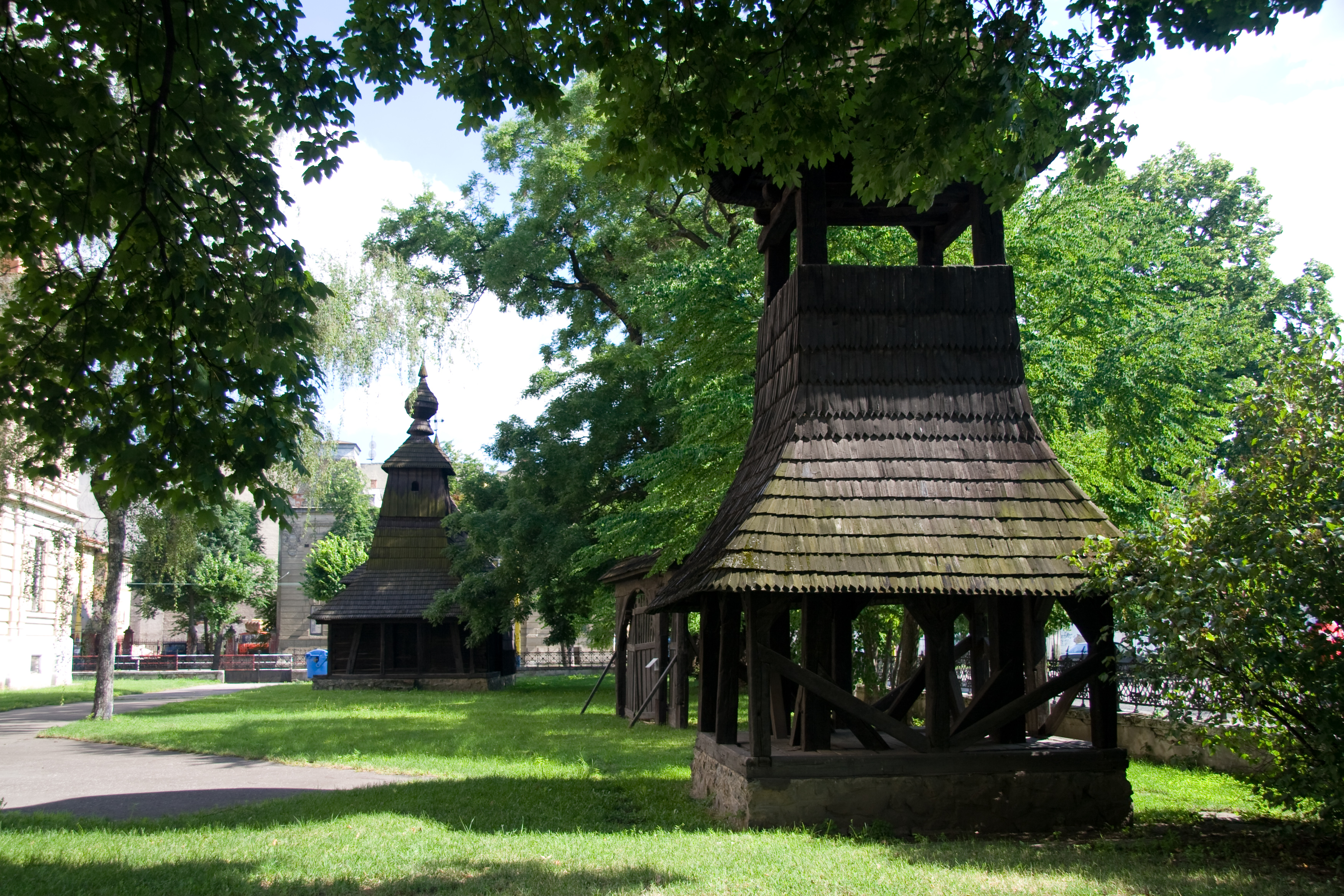
The wooden church from Kožuchovce and wooden belfry from Transcarpathia

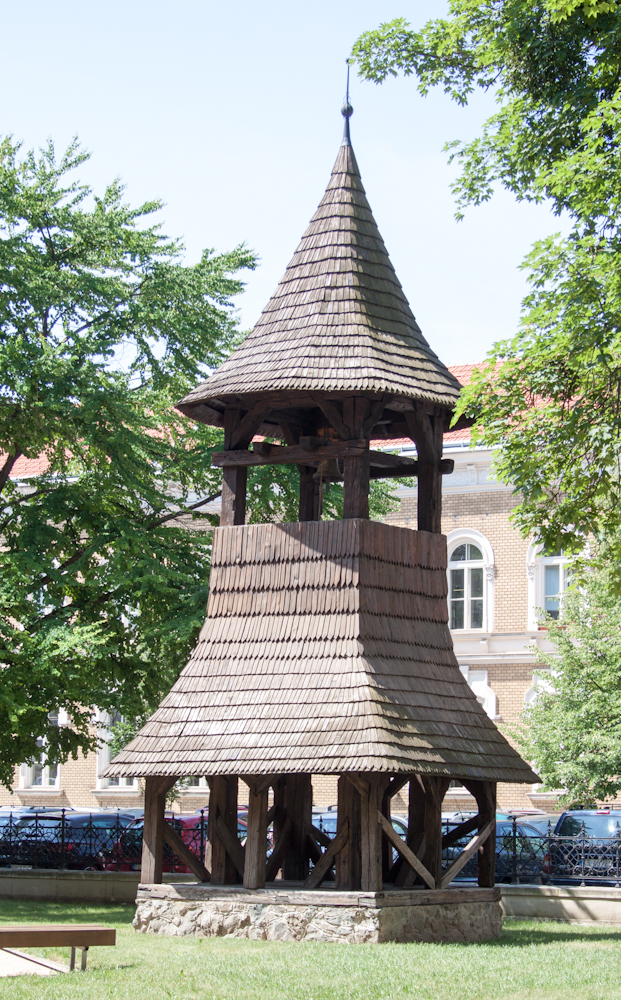
The wooden belfry from a village in Transcarpathian Ukraine

"Experience Gothic" permanent exhibit (art history and material culture)

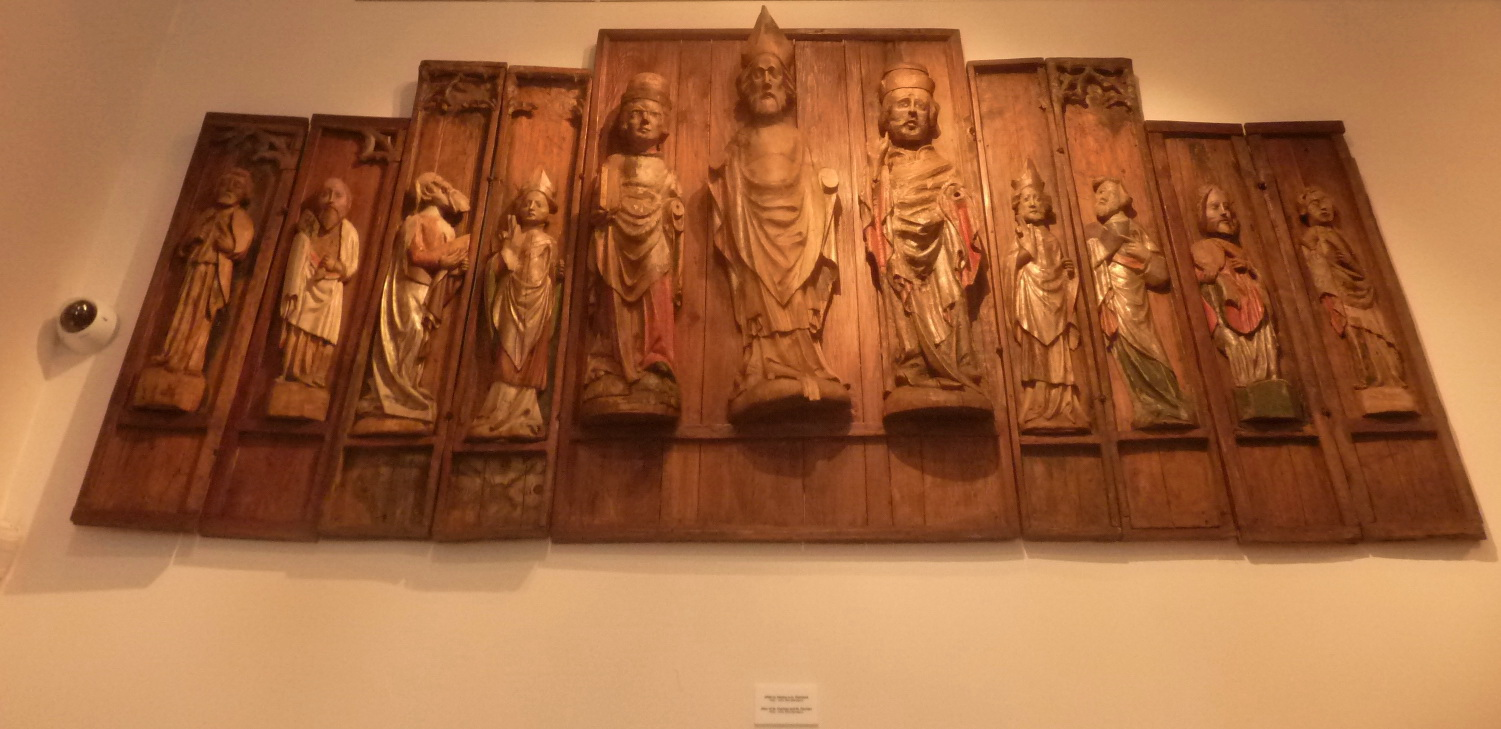
Church altar of Saints Cosmas and Damian, 1380-1400, Šiba, Šariš region

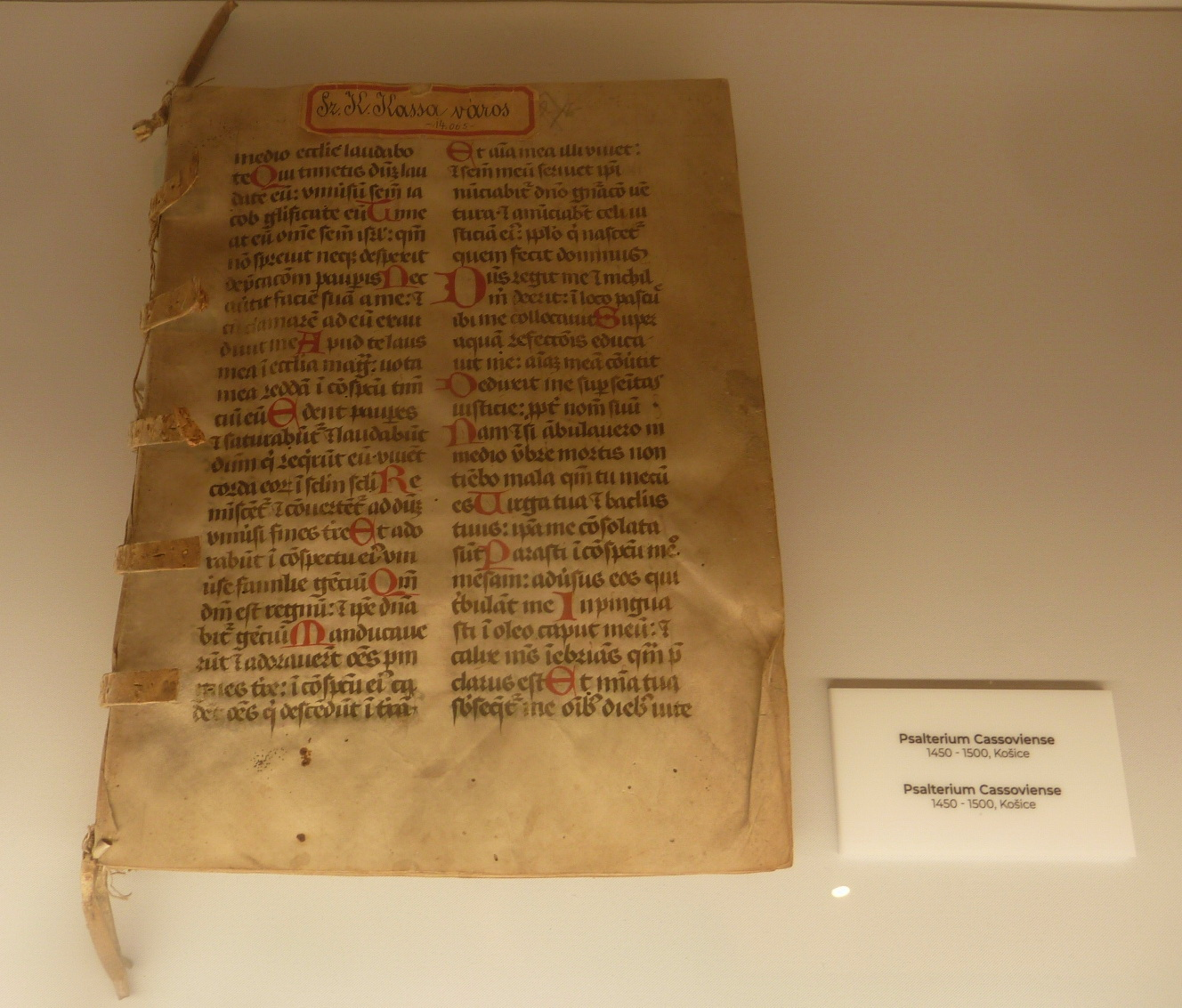
Psalterium Cassoviense, the Košice Psalter, second half of the 15th century (1450-1500)

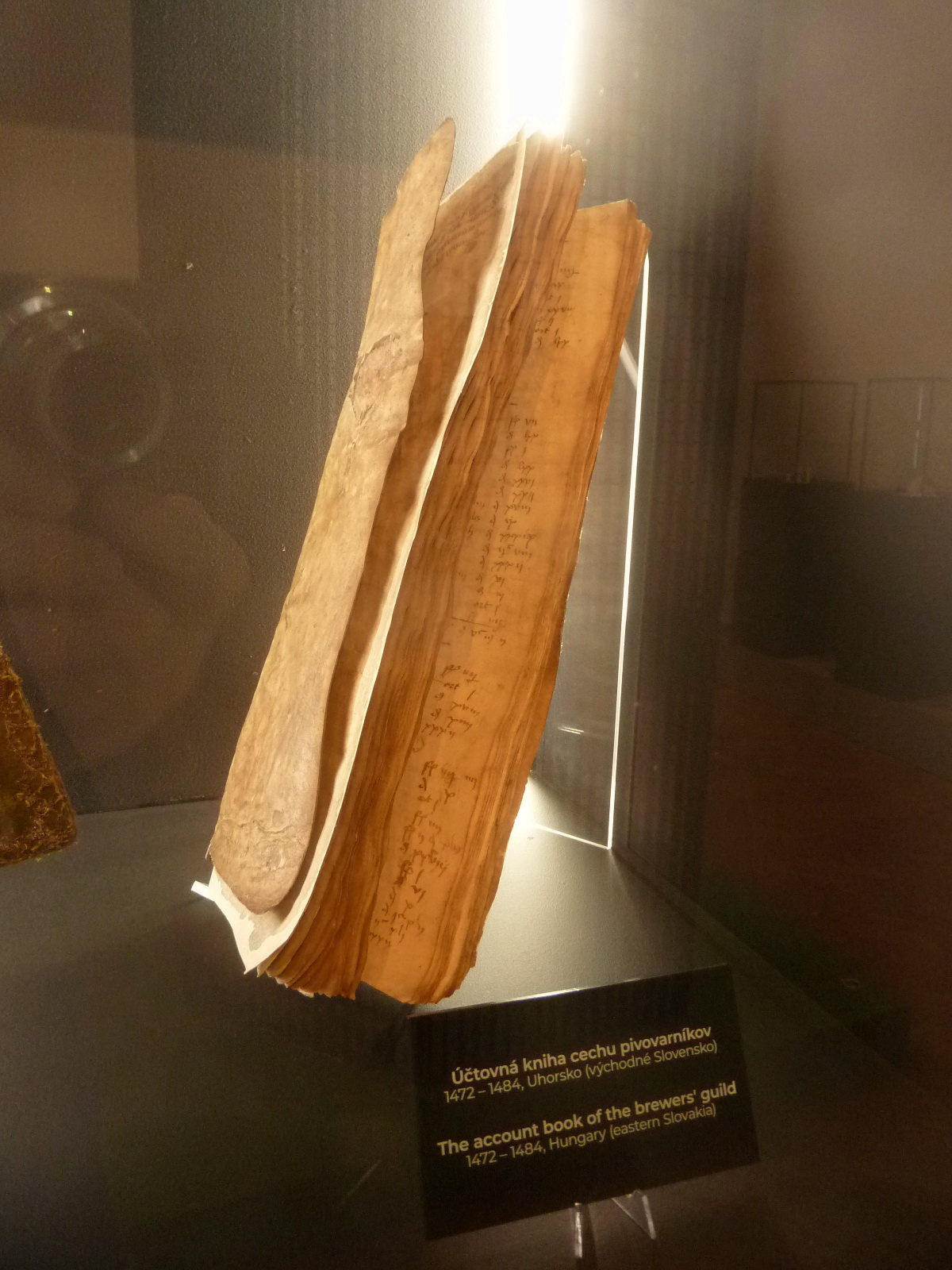
The account book of the Košice brewer's guild, 1472-1484

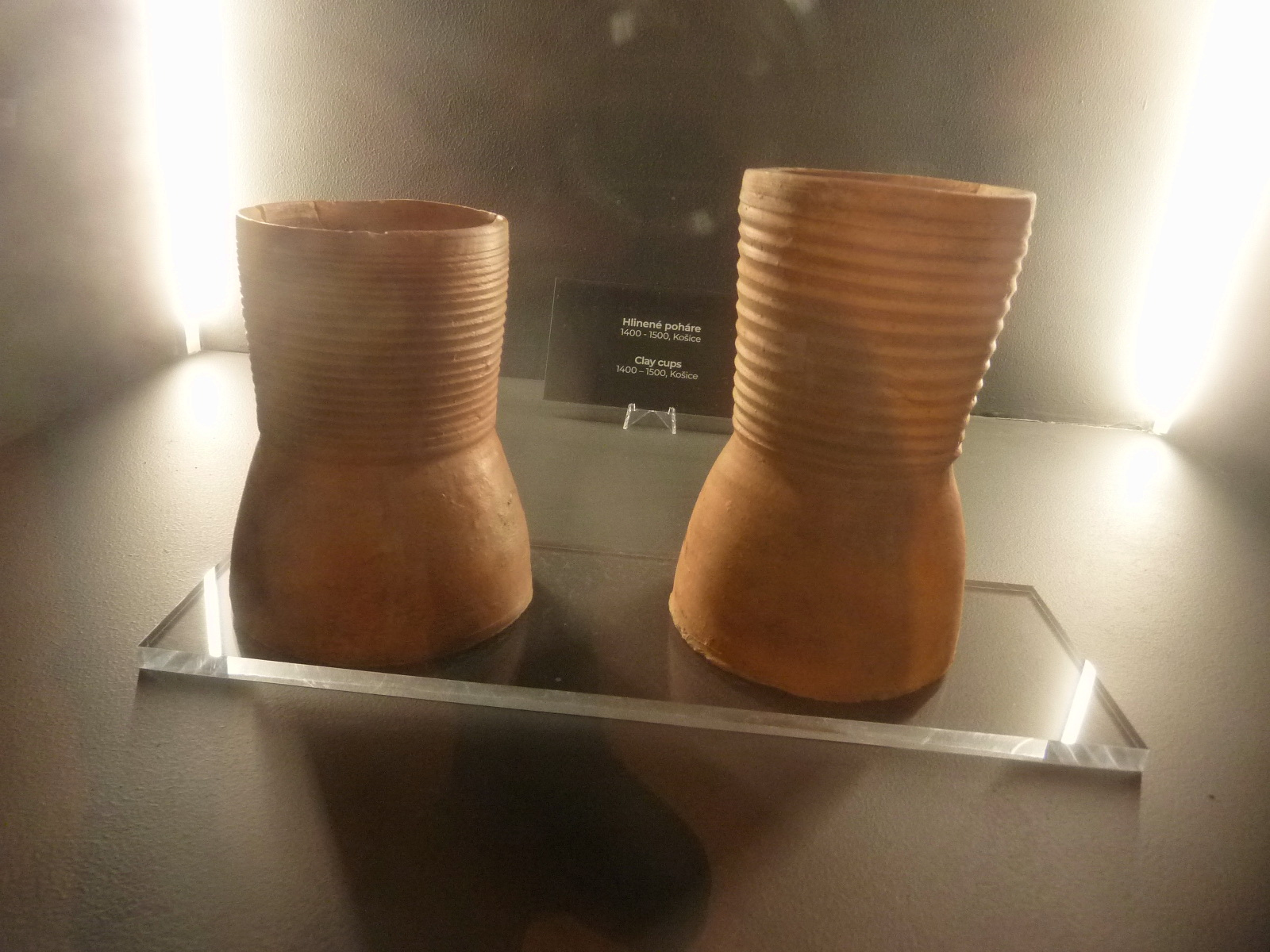
Clay drinking cups, 15th century, Košice

Archaeological collections

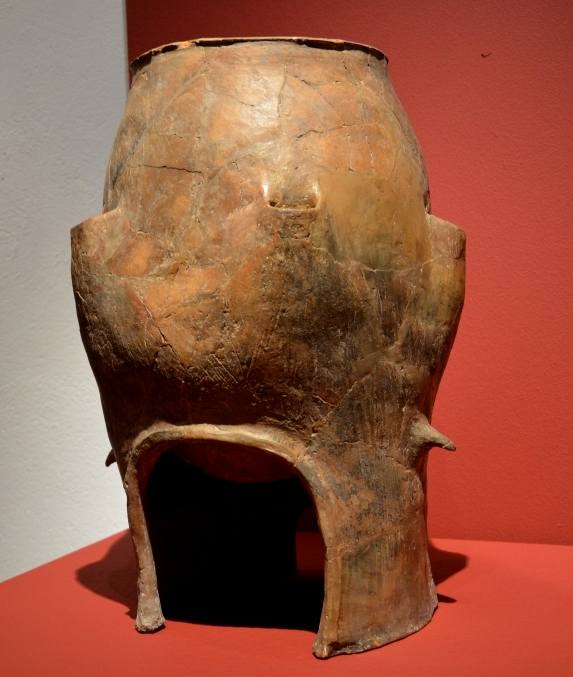
Portable clay stove of the Ottomány culture

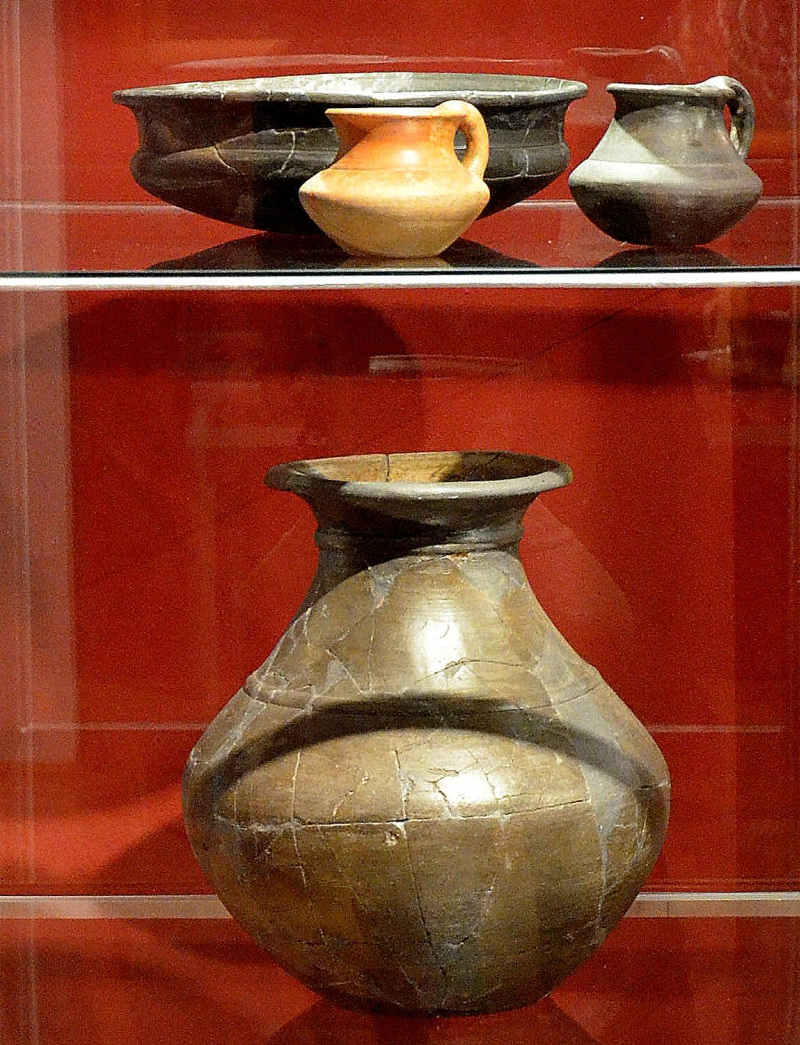
Iron Age Celtic pottery (2nd century BC)

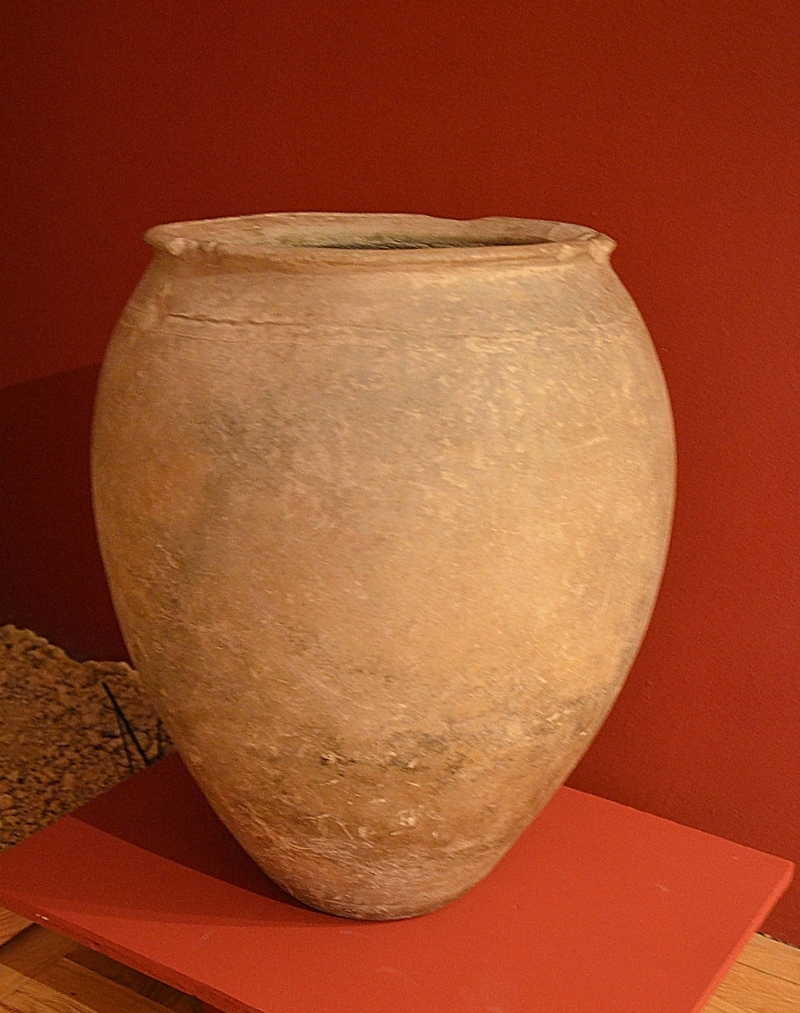
Roman era ceramic pot

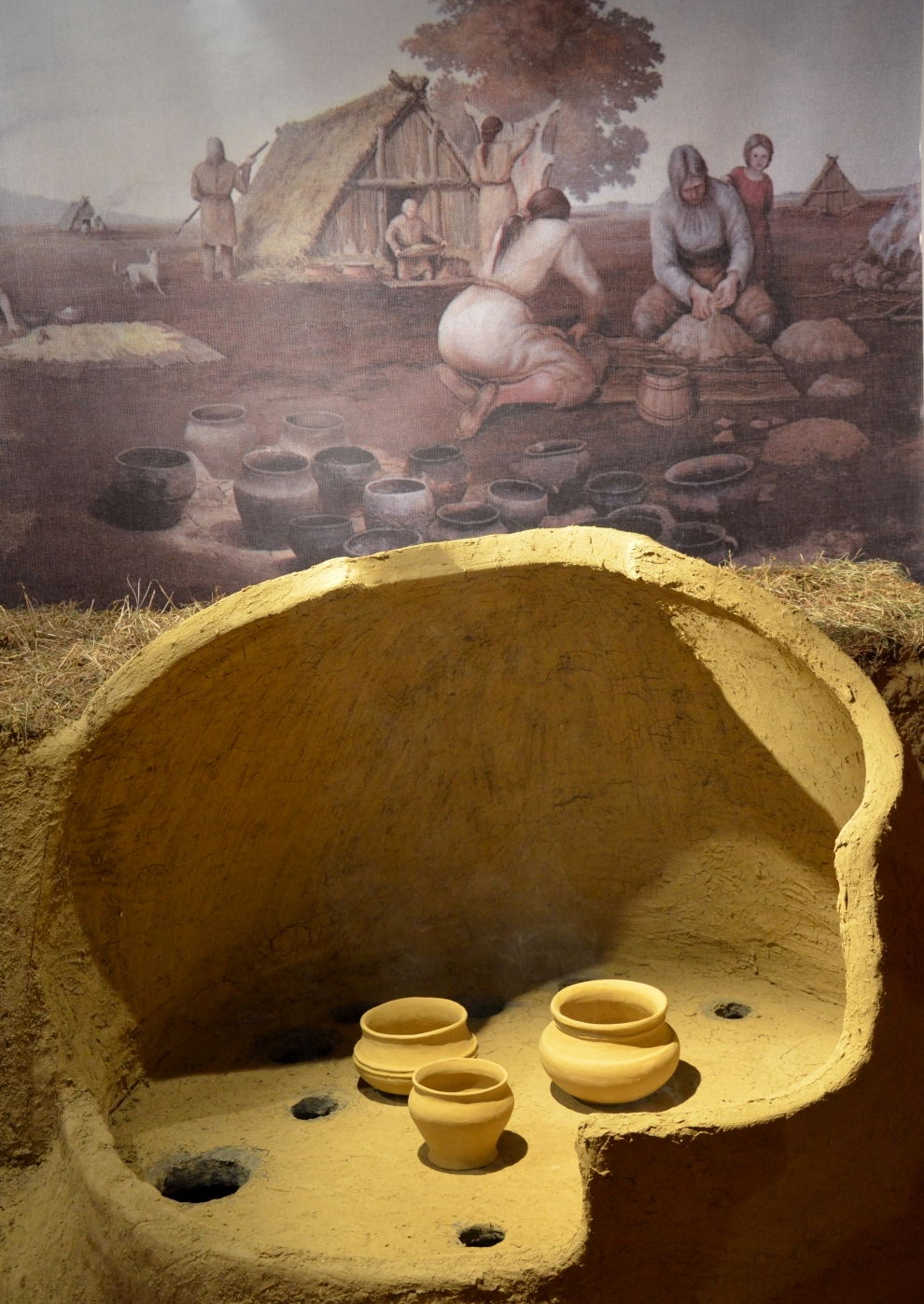
Roman era pottery stove

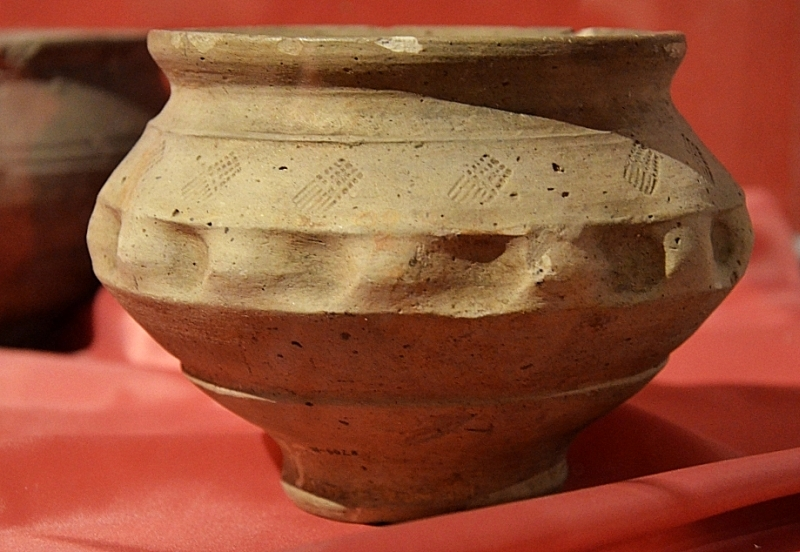
Vandalic ceramic bowl (3rd century AD)

Period furniture collections

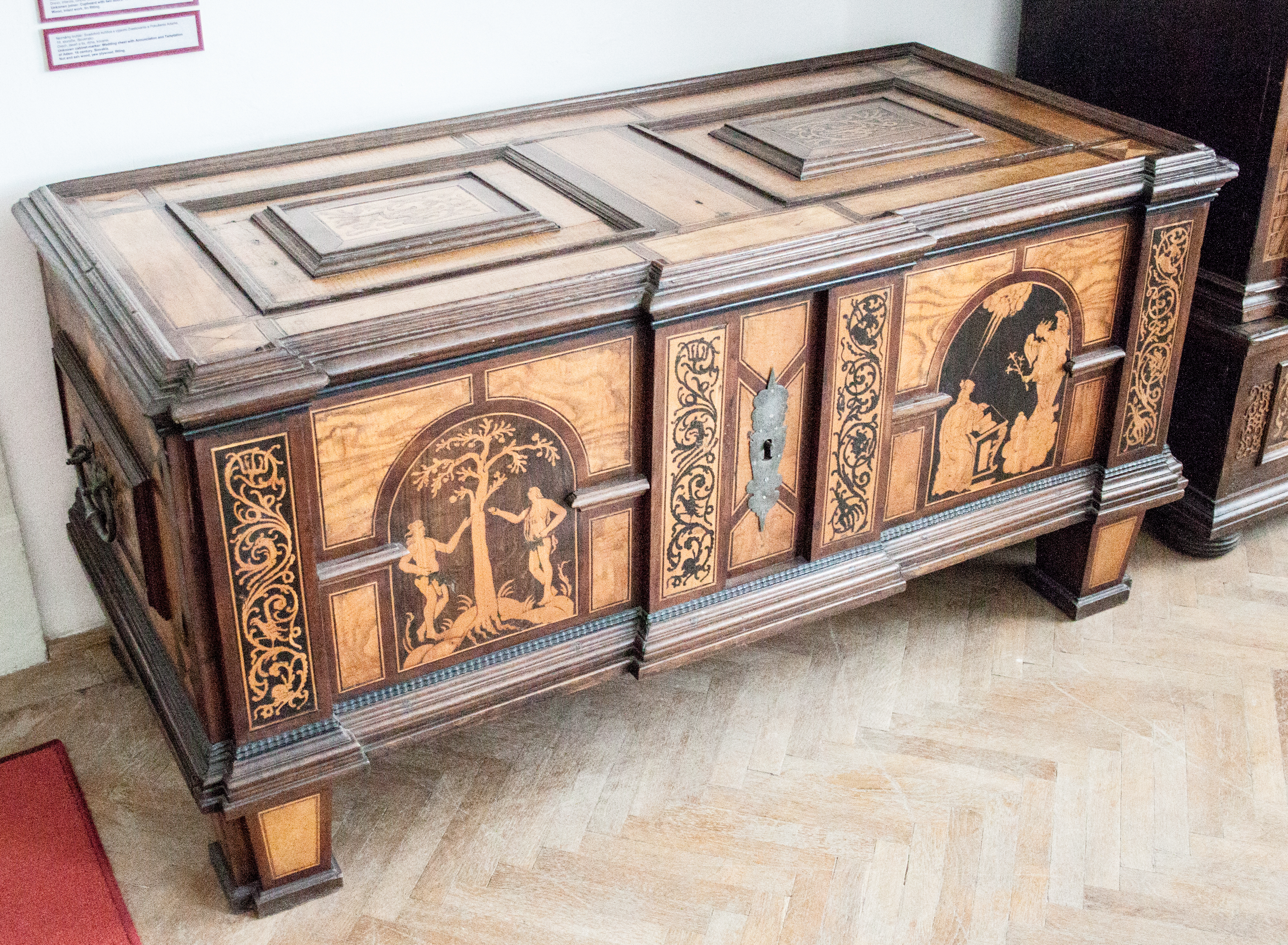
A historical wedding chest

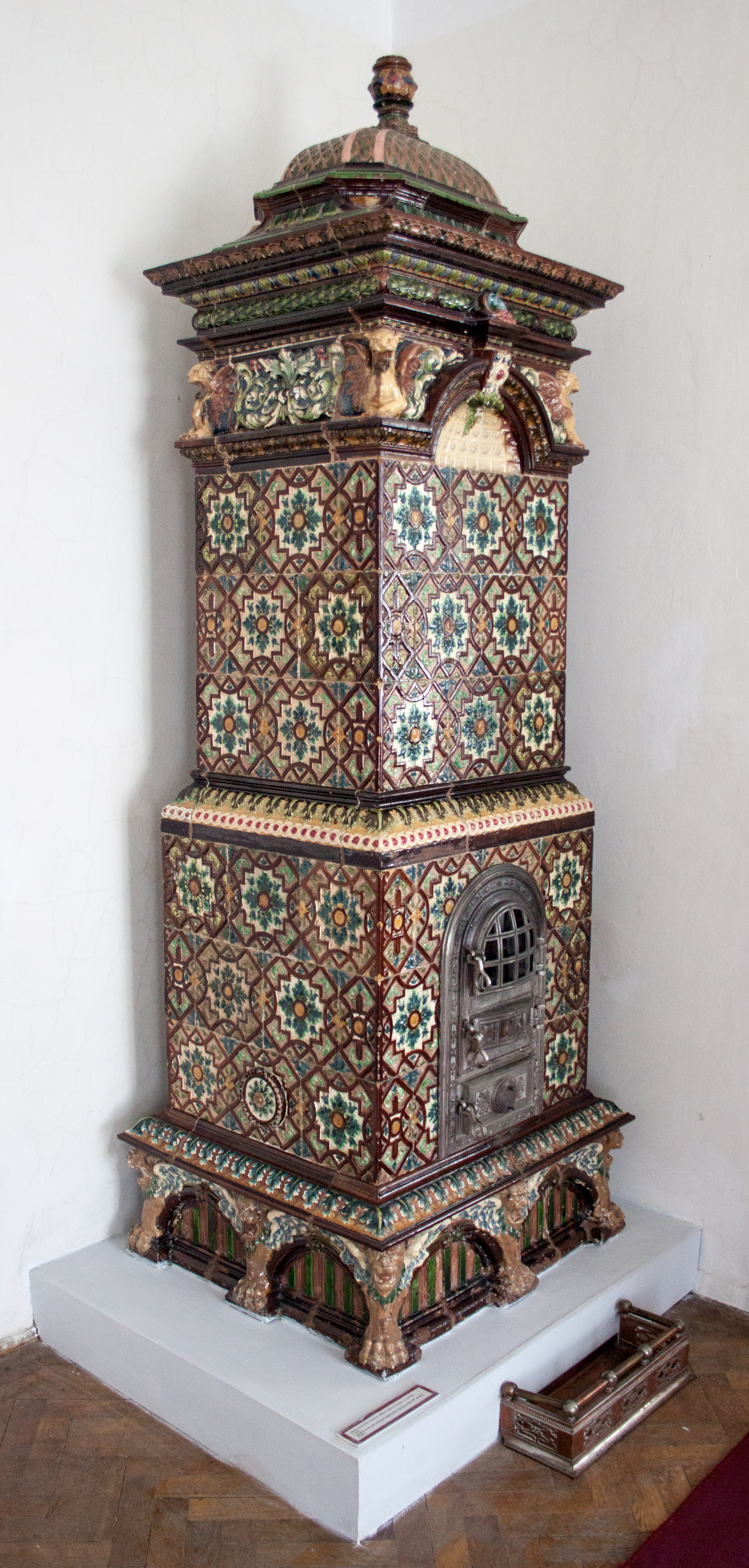
Cocklestove

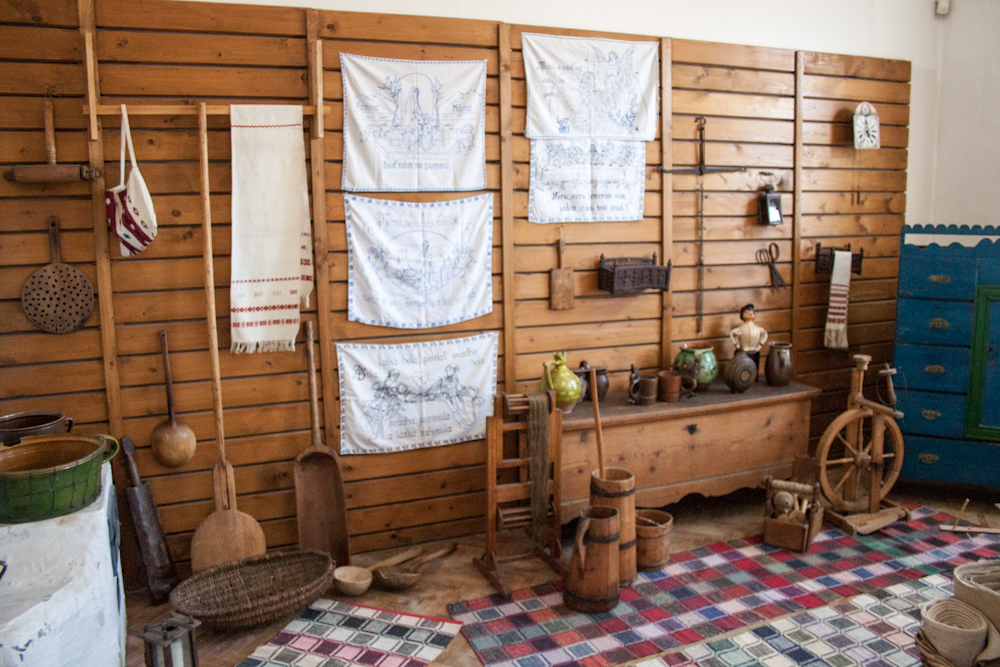
Folk art interior, typical of Abov county

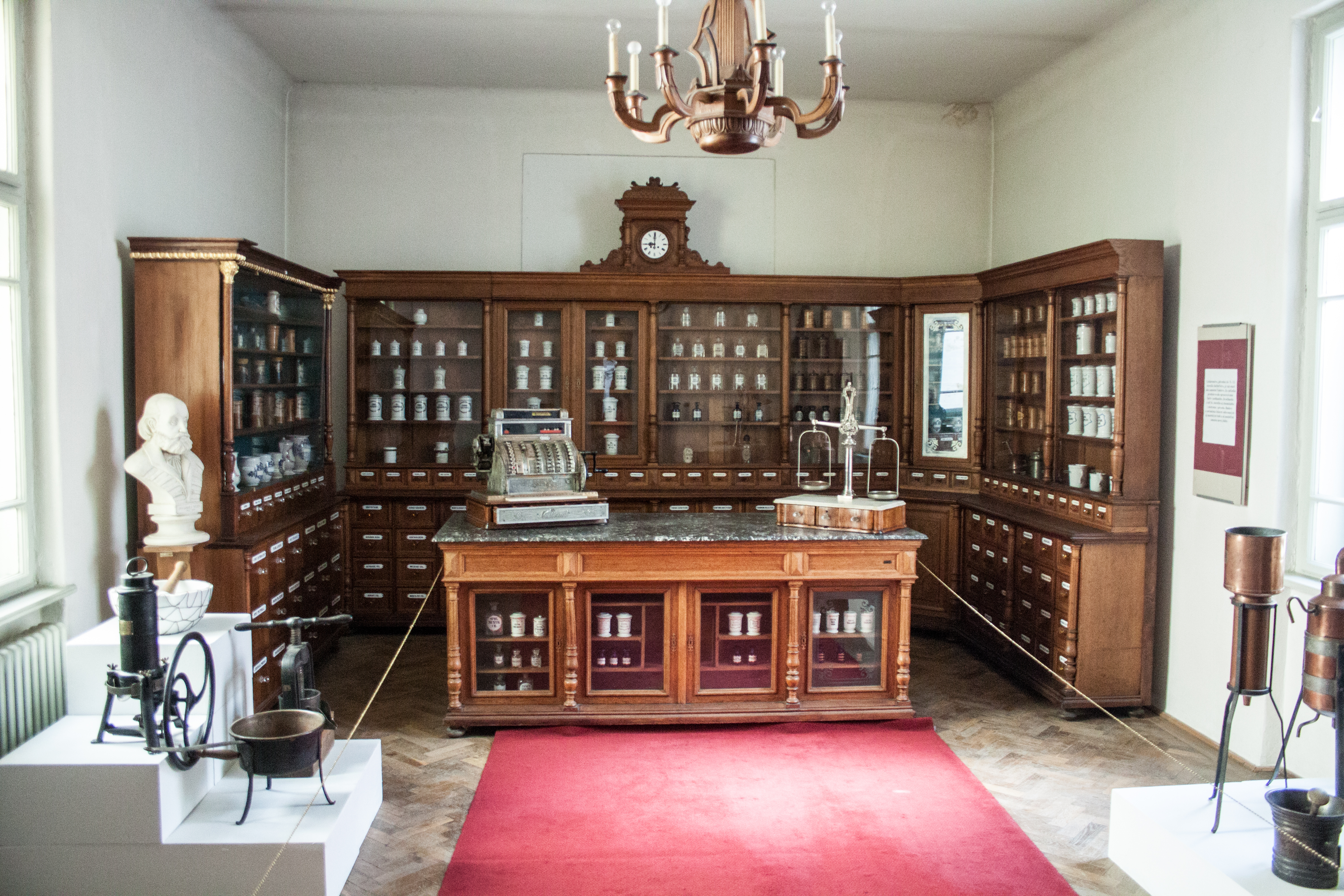
Historical pharmacy display in the East Slovak Museum

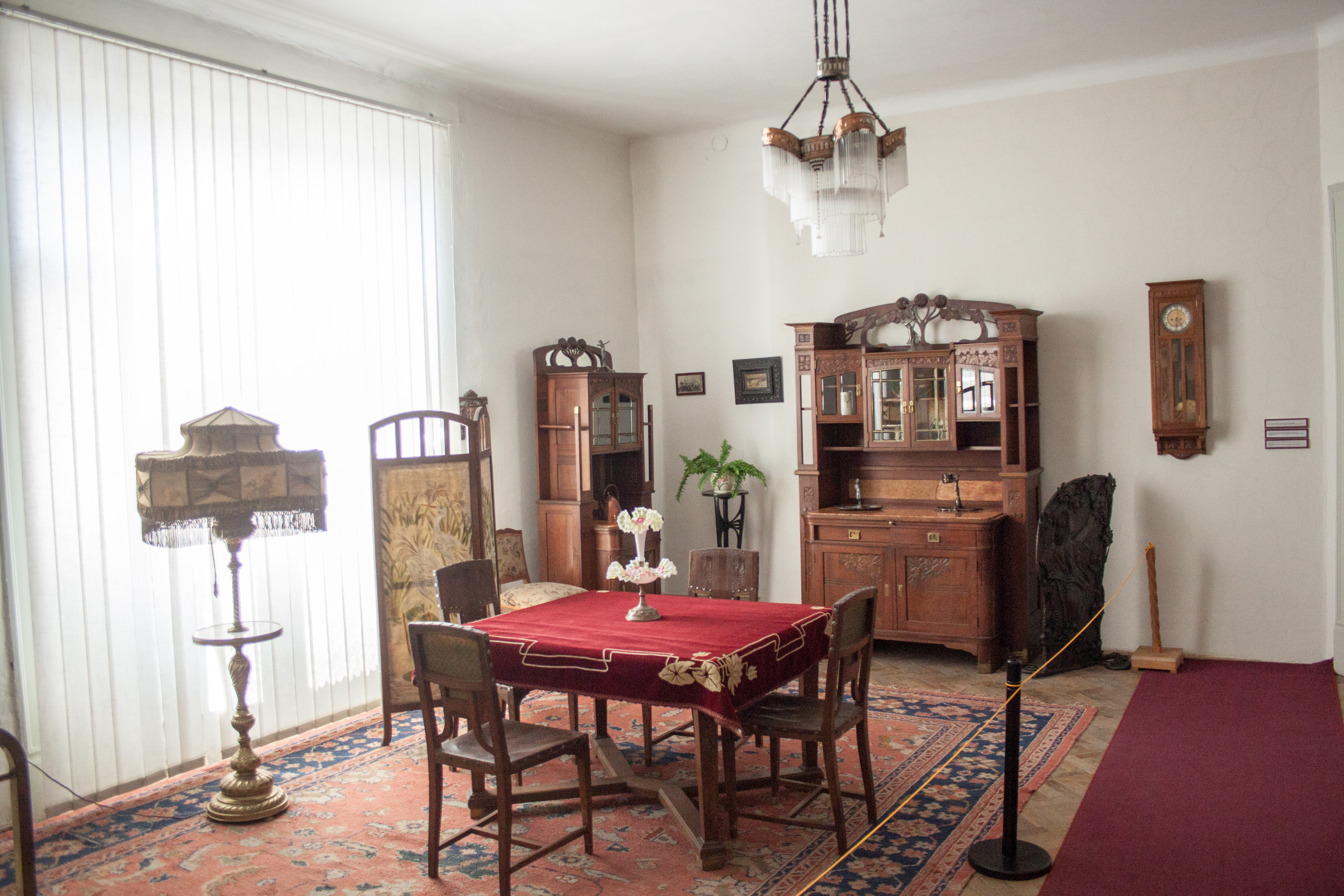
Art Nouveau interior

Collections from the former art history exhibit 'Centuries in Art' (Hviezdoslavova Street)

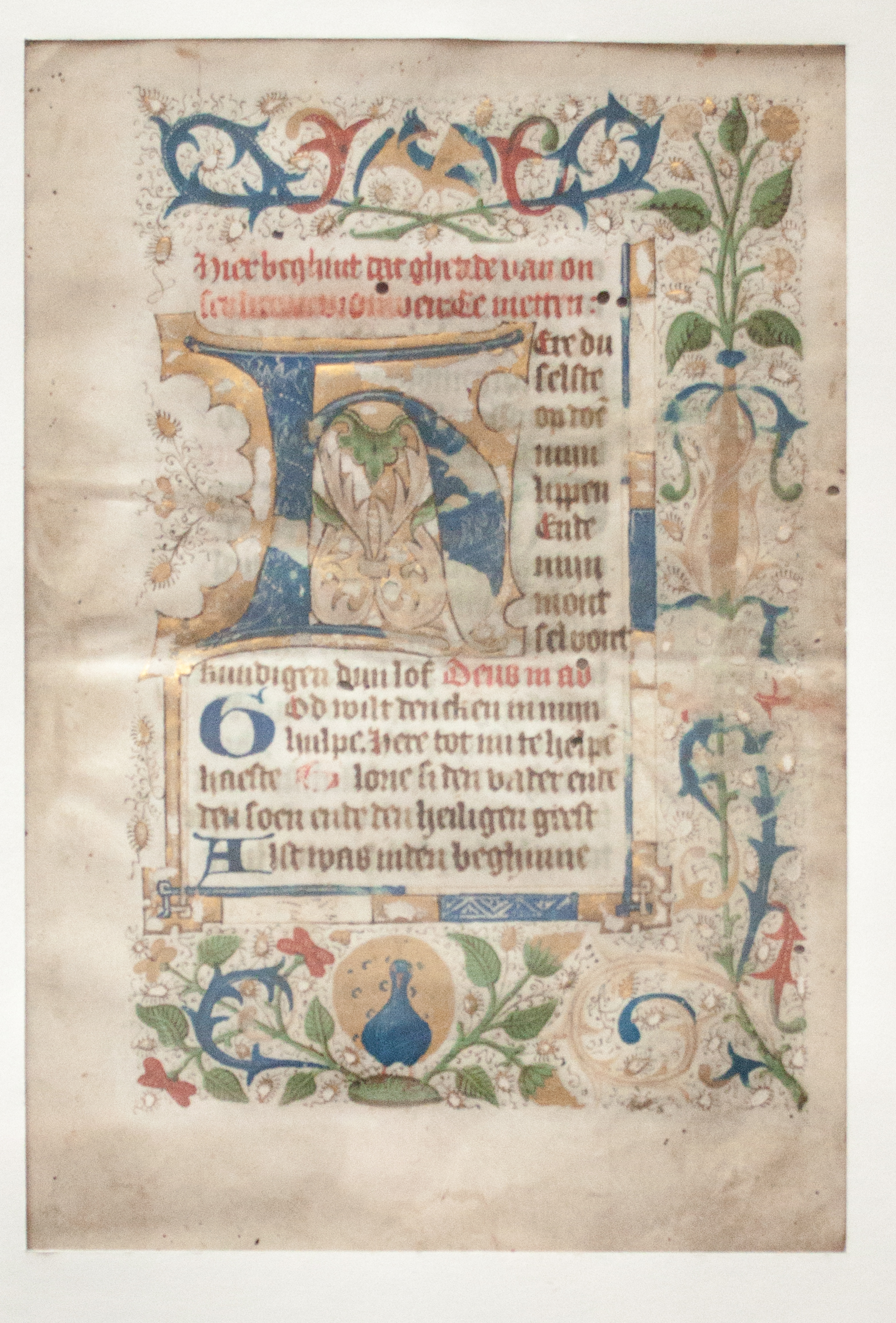
Medieval book by anonymous miniaturist from Delft

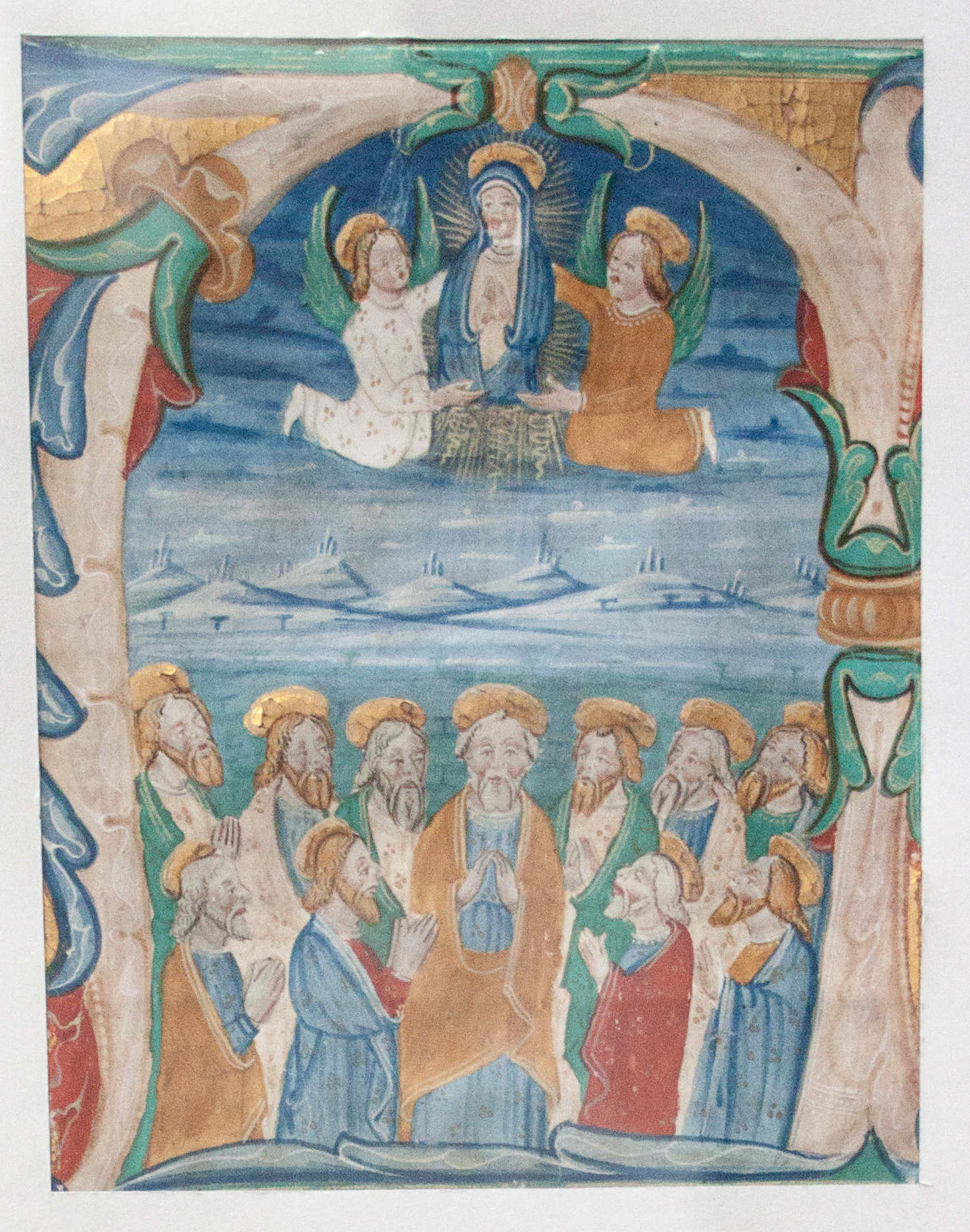
Medieval religious miniature by anonymous miniaturist from Italy

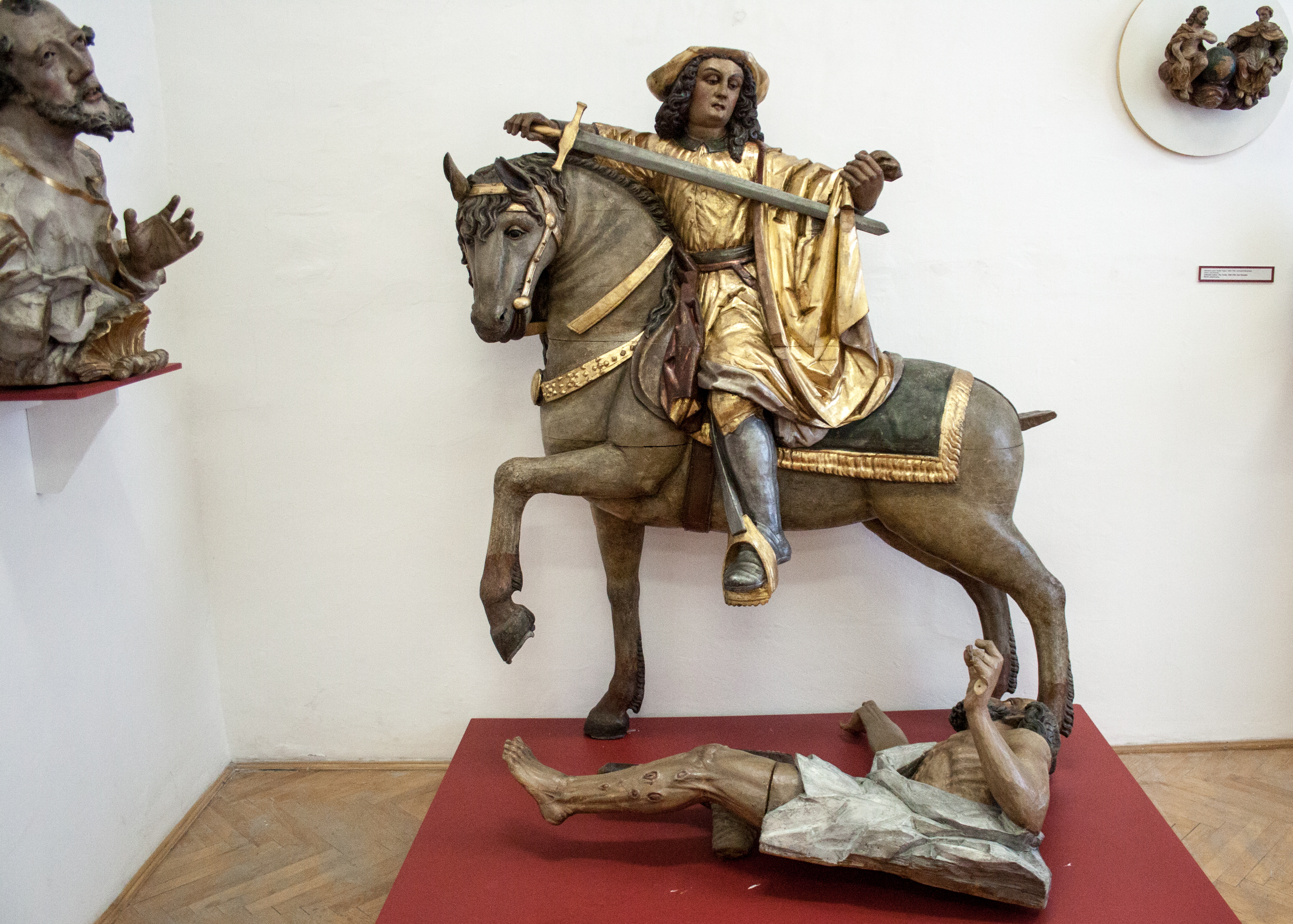
Sculpture of St Martin

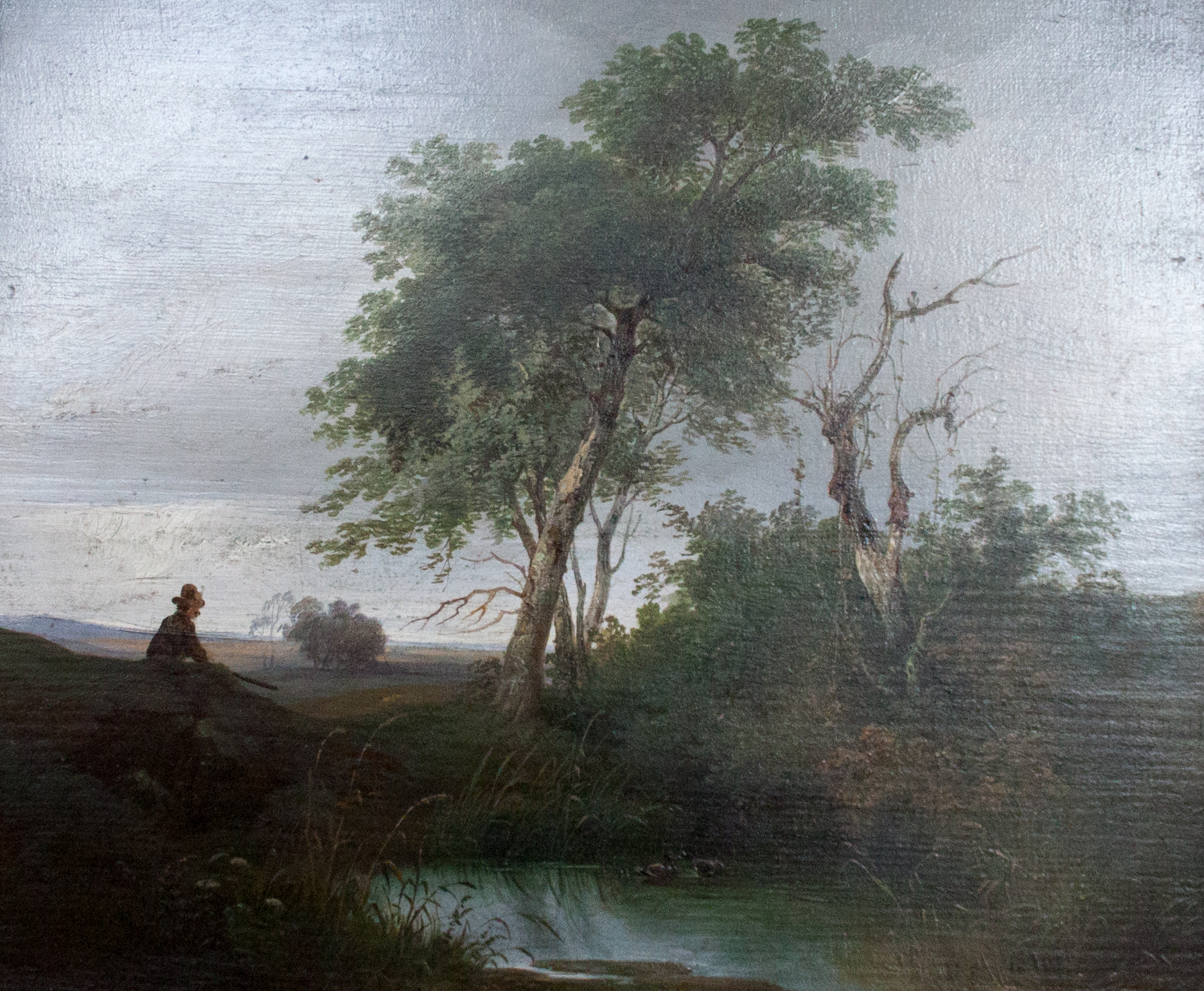
Painting from the 1820s

Natural history exhibit (Hviezdoslavova Street)

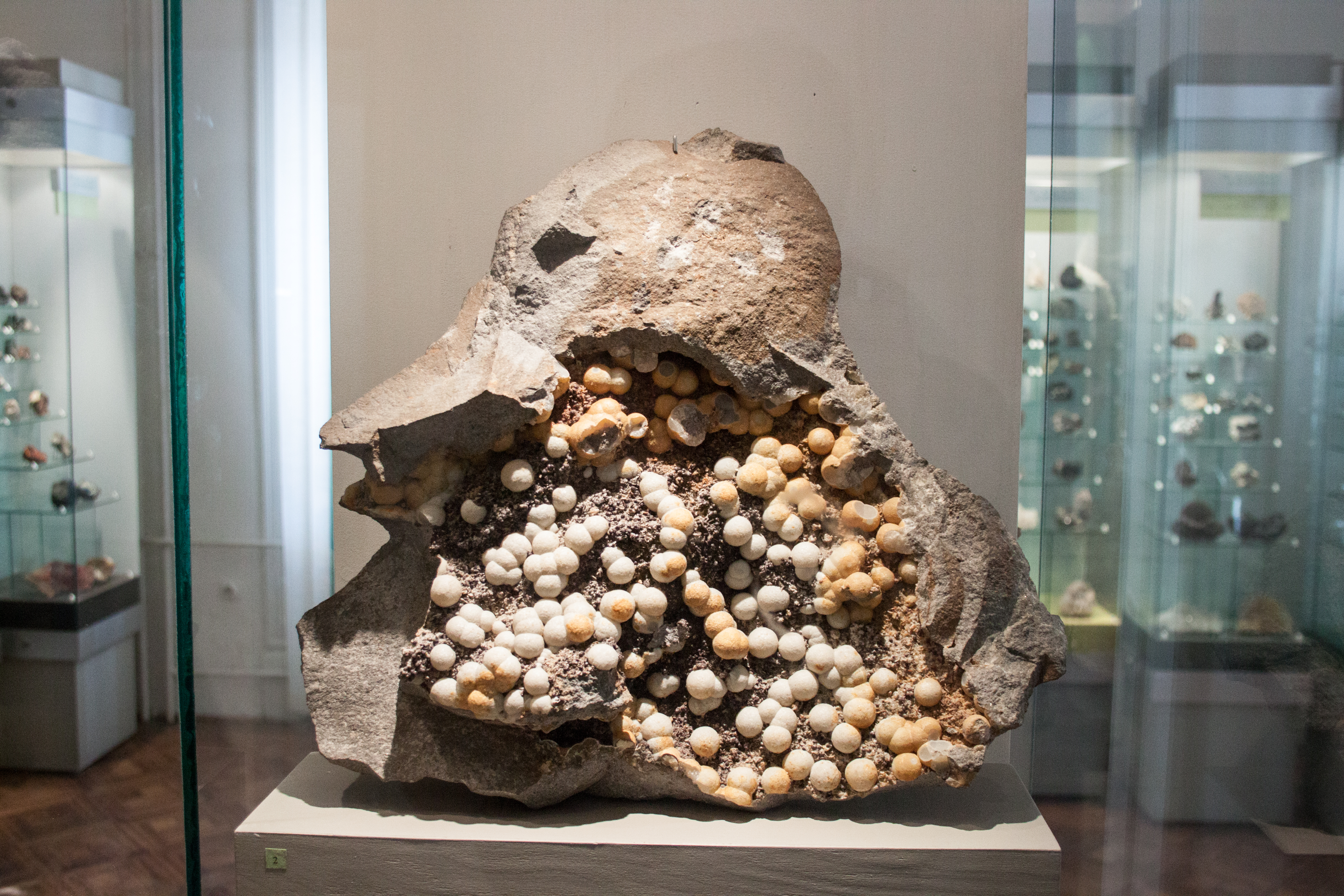
Mineral exhibit

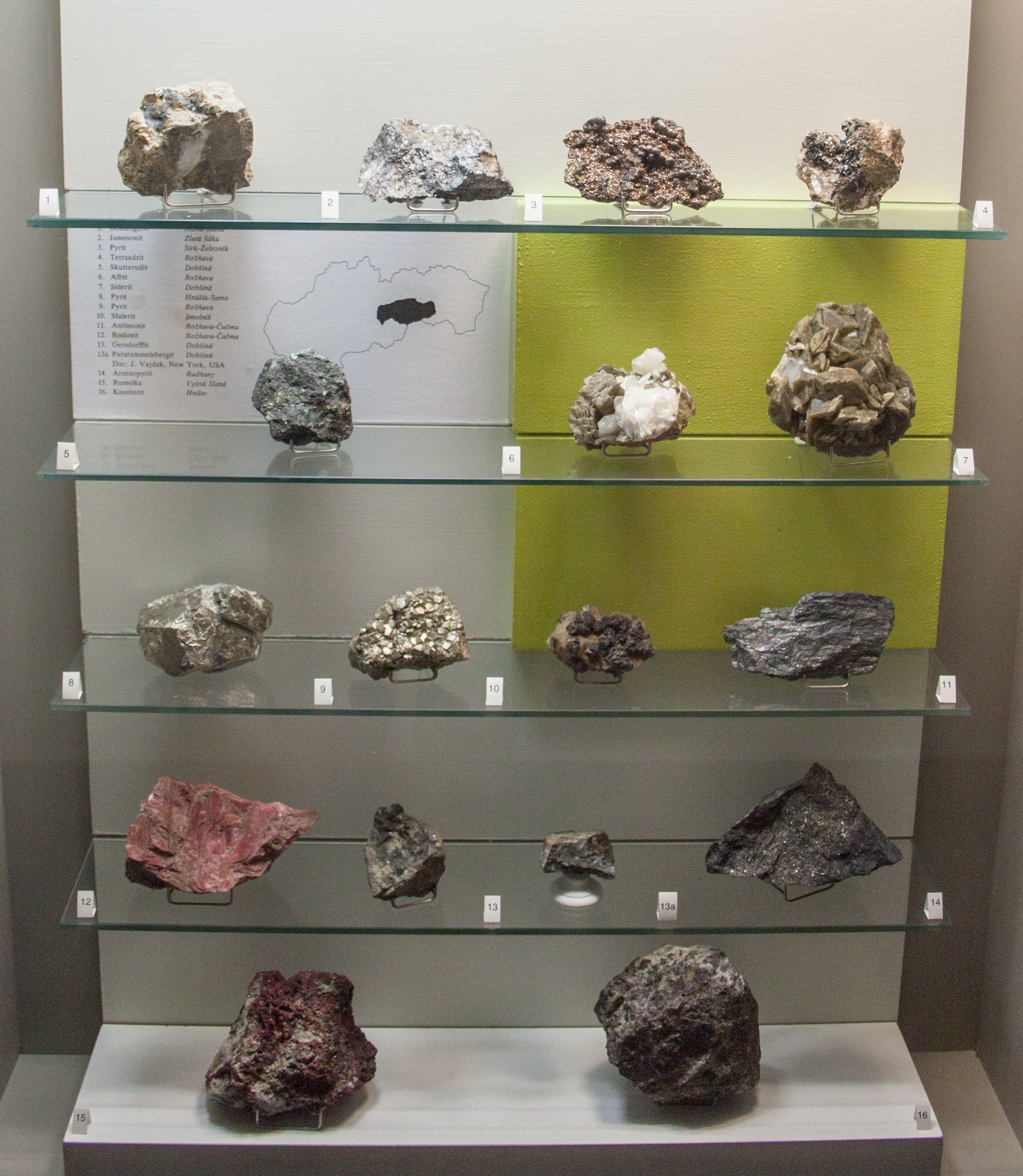
Various minerals found in east Slovakia

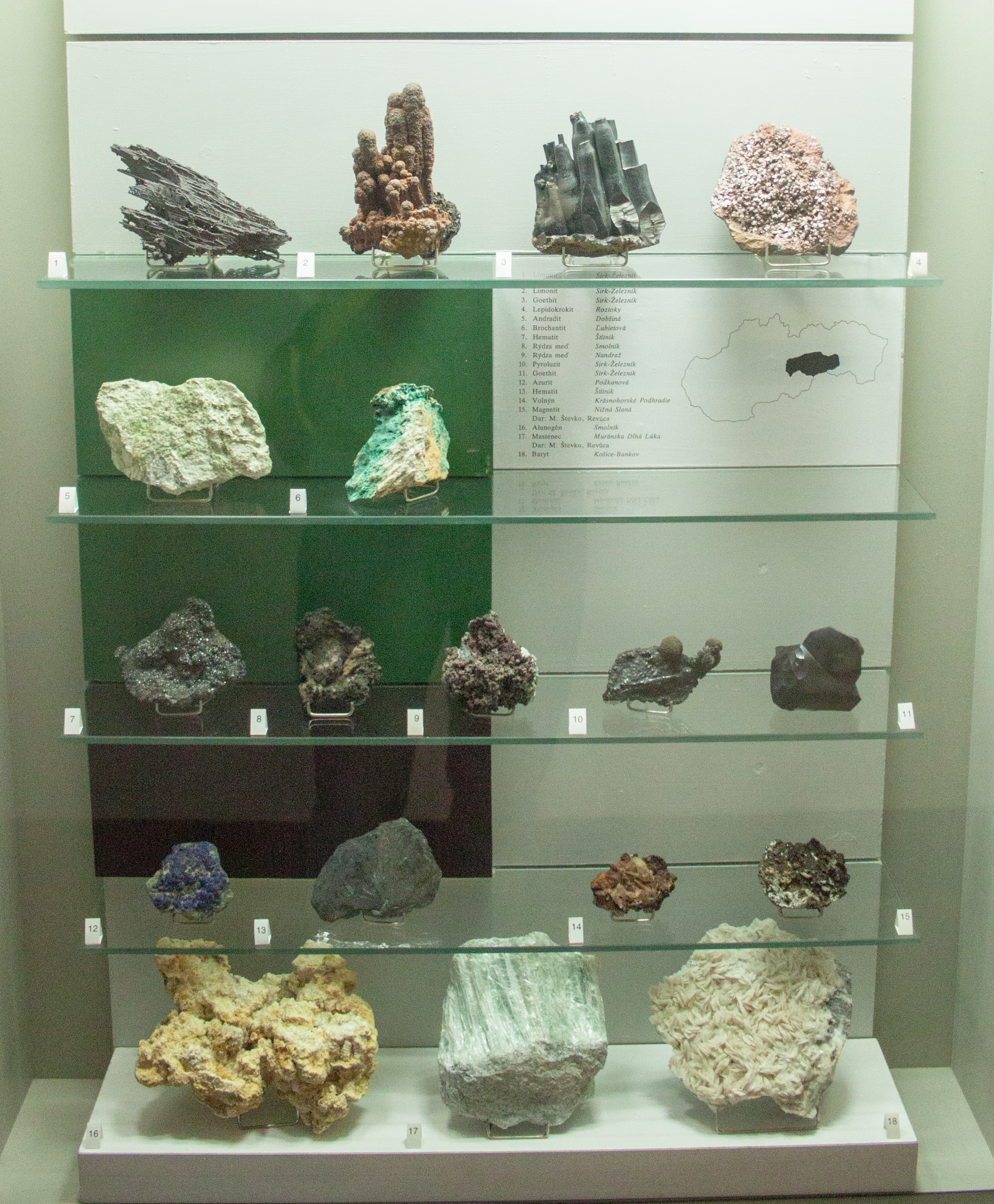
Various minerals found in east Slovakia

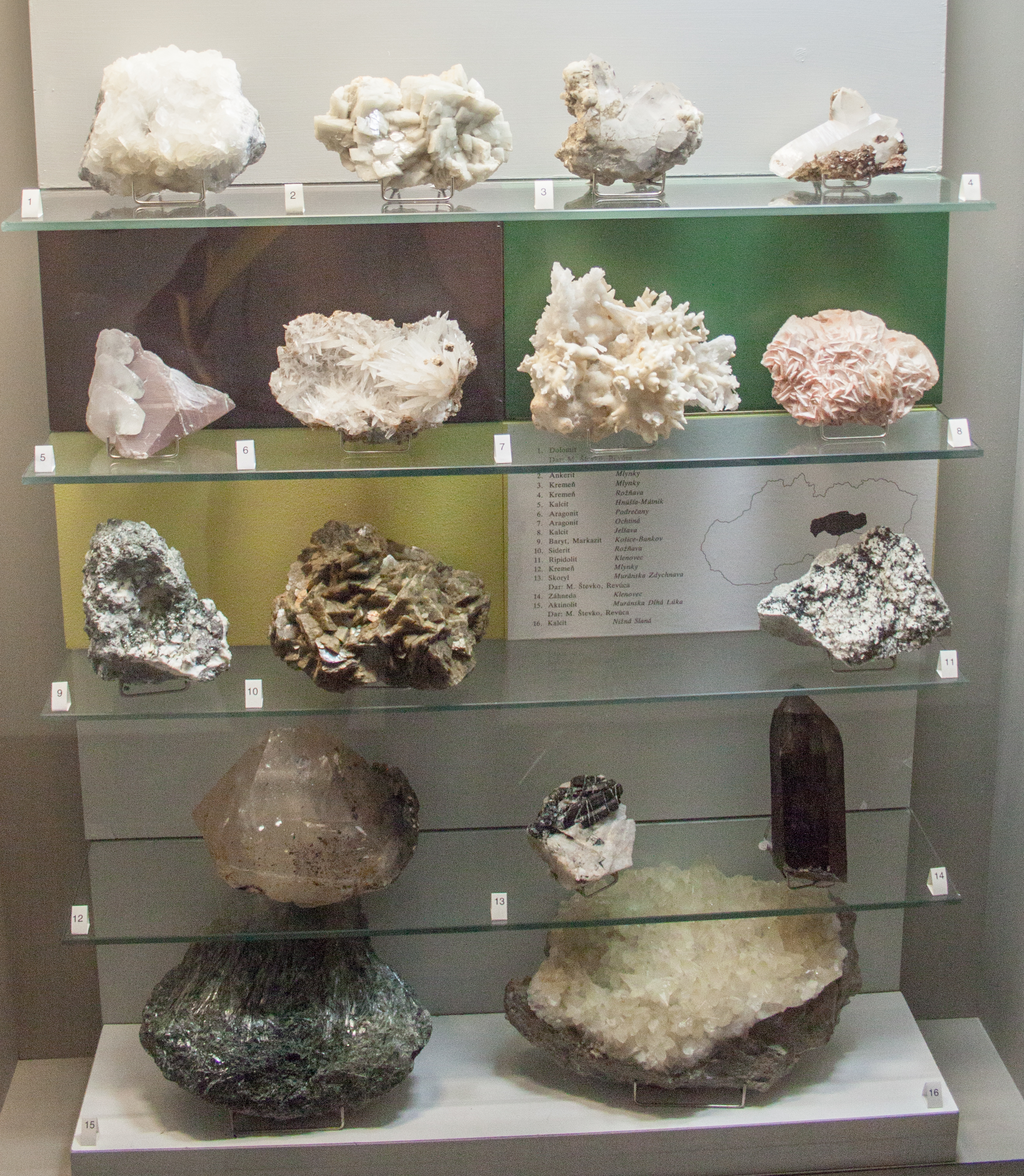
Various minerals found in east Slovakia

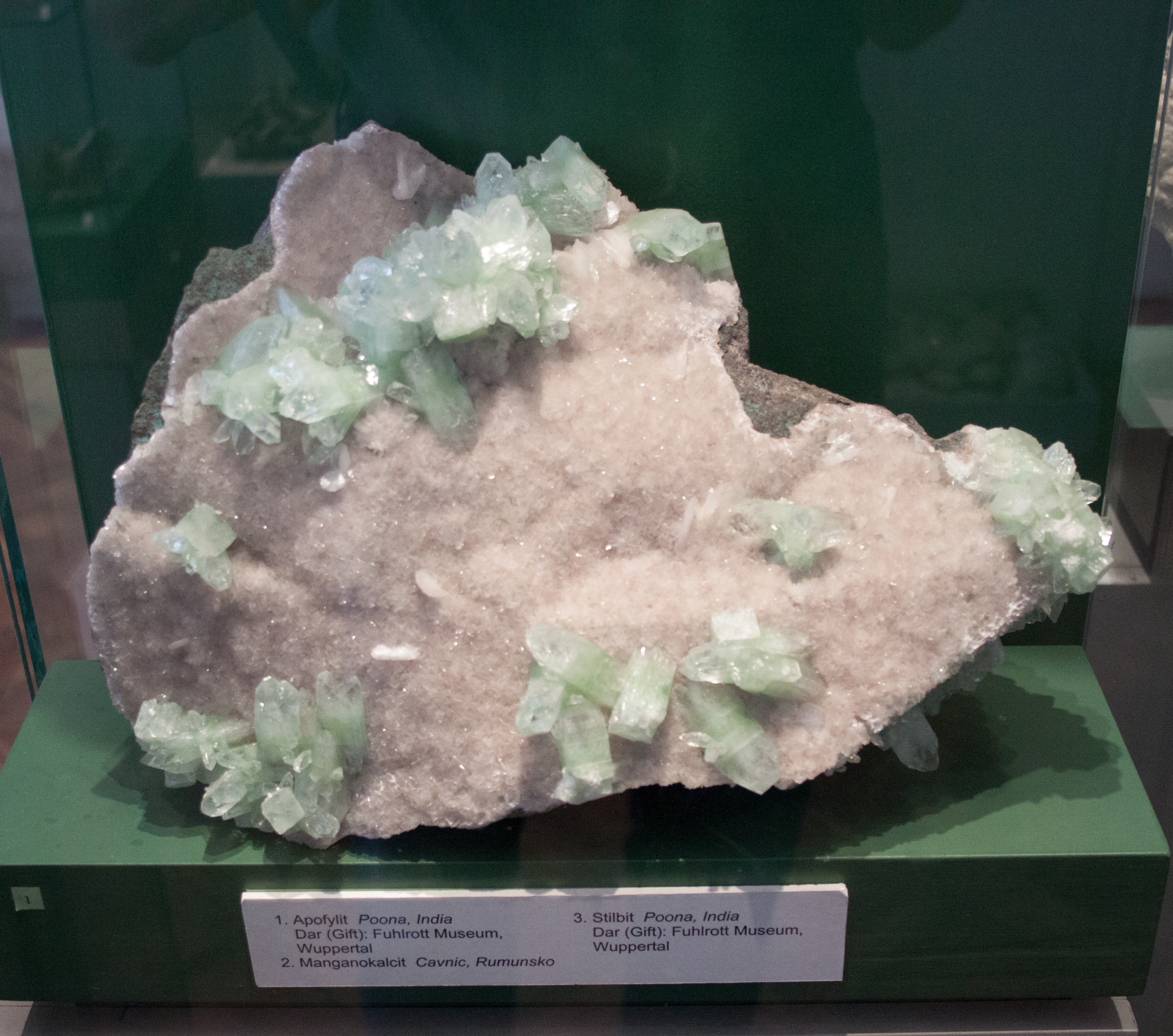
Apophyllite, mangano calcite and stilbite

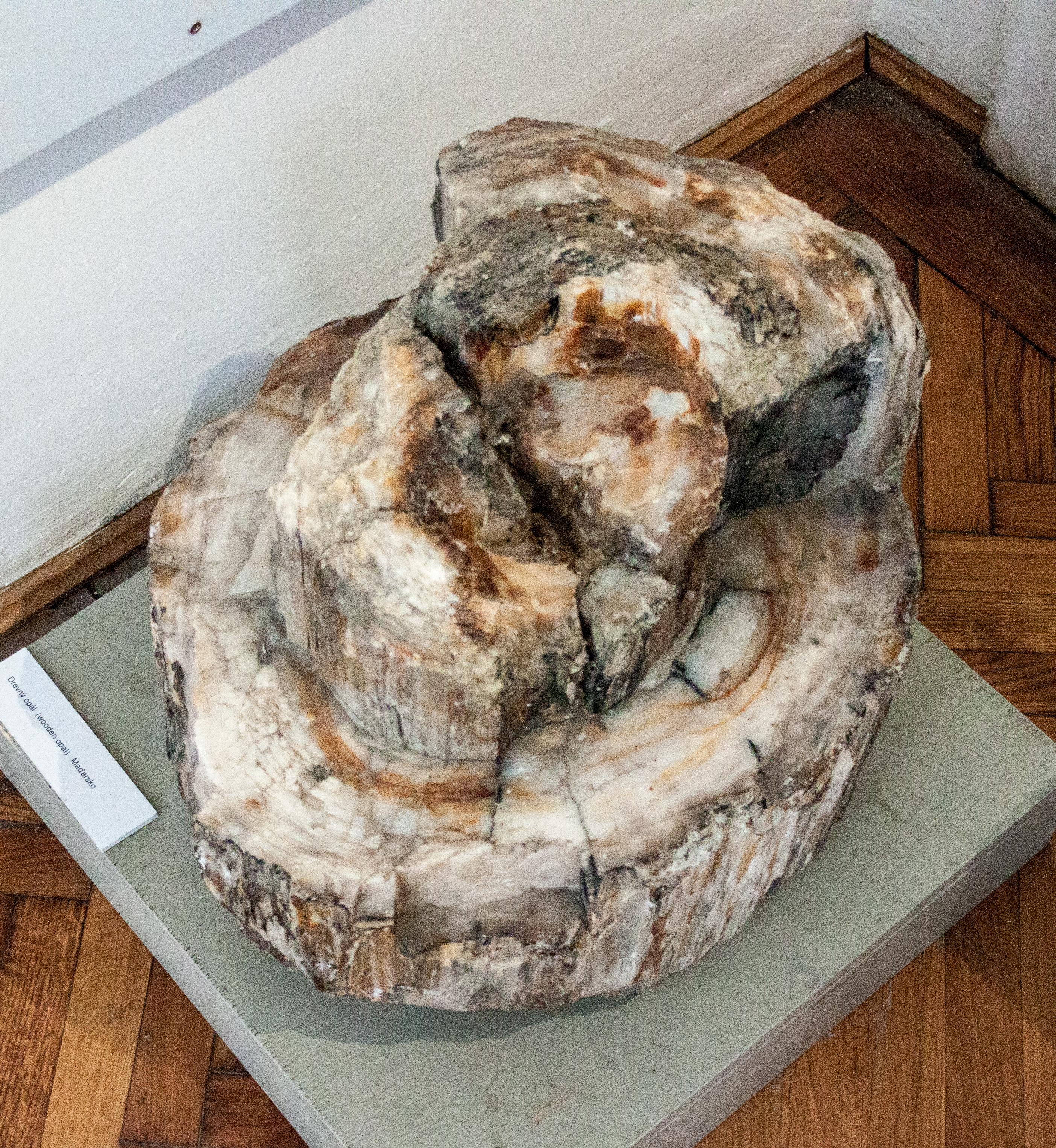
Wooden opal from east Slovakia

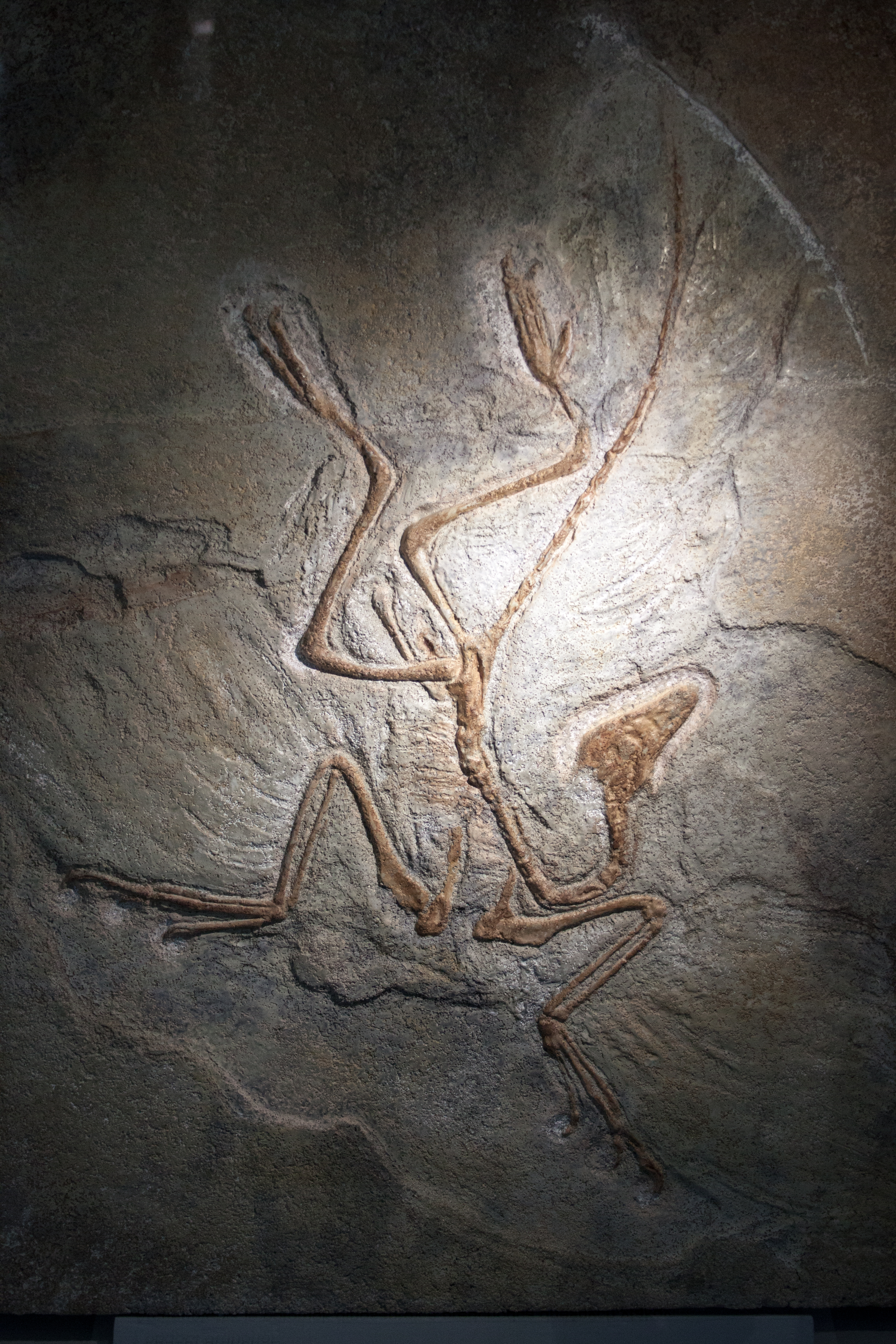
Archaeopteryx fossil

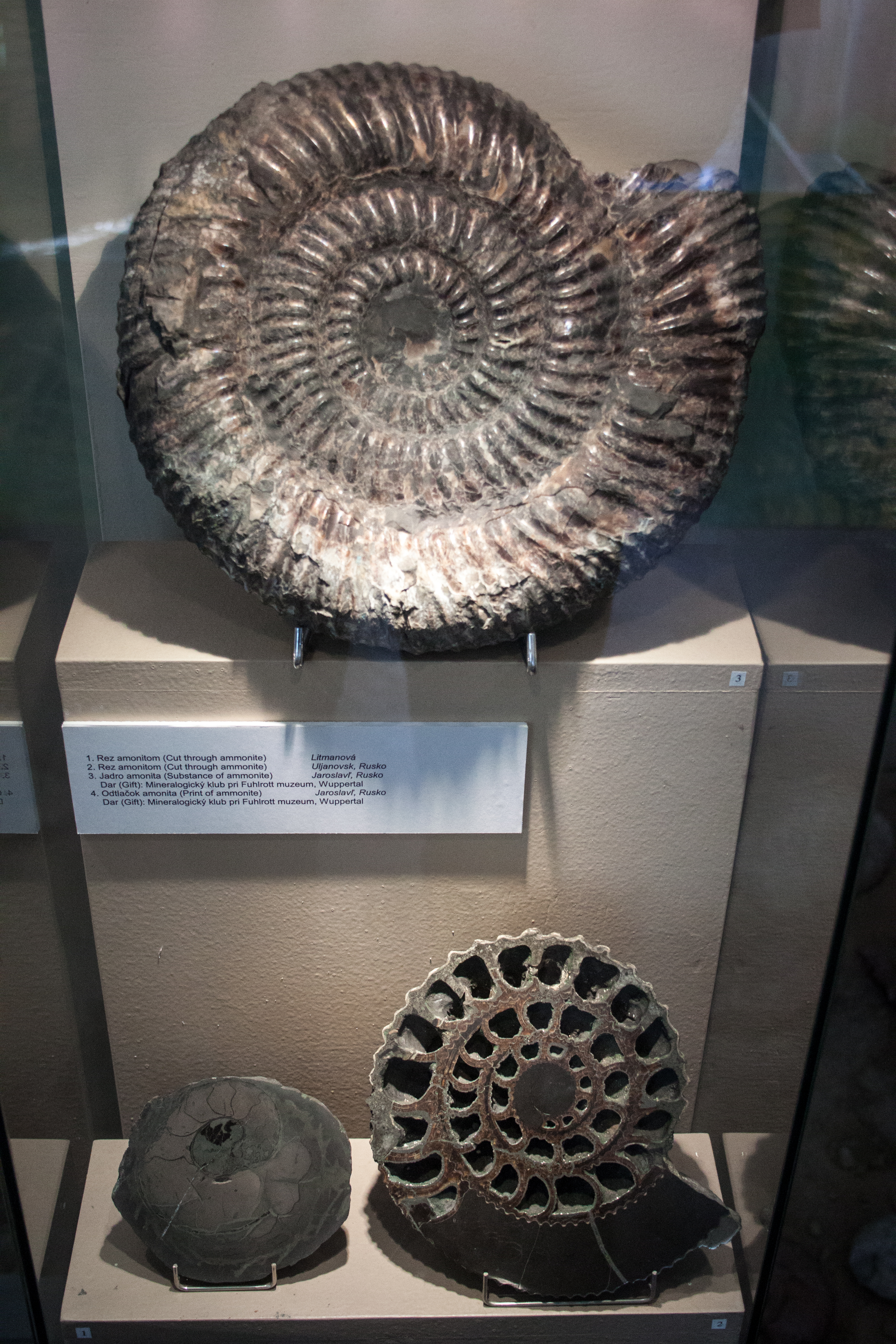
Ammonites

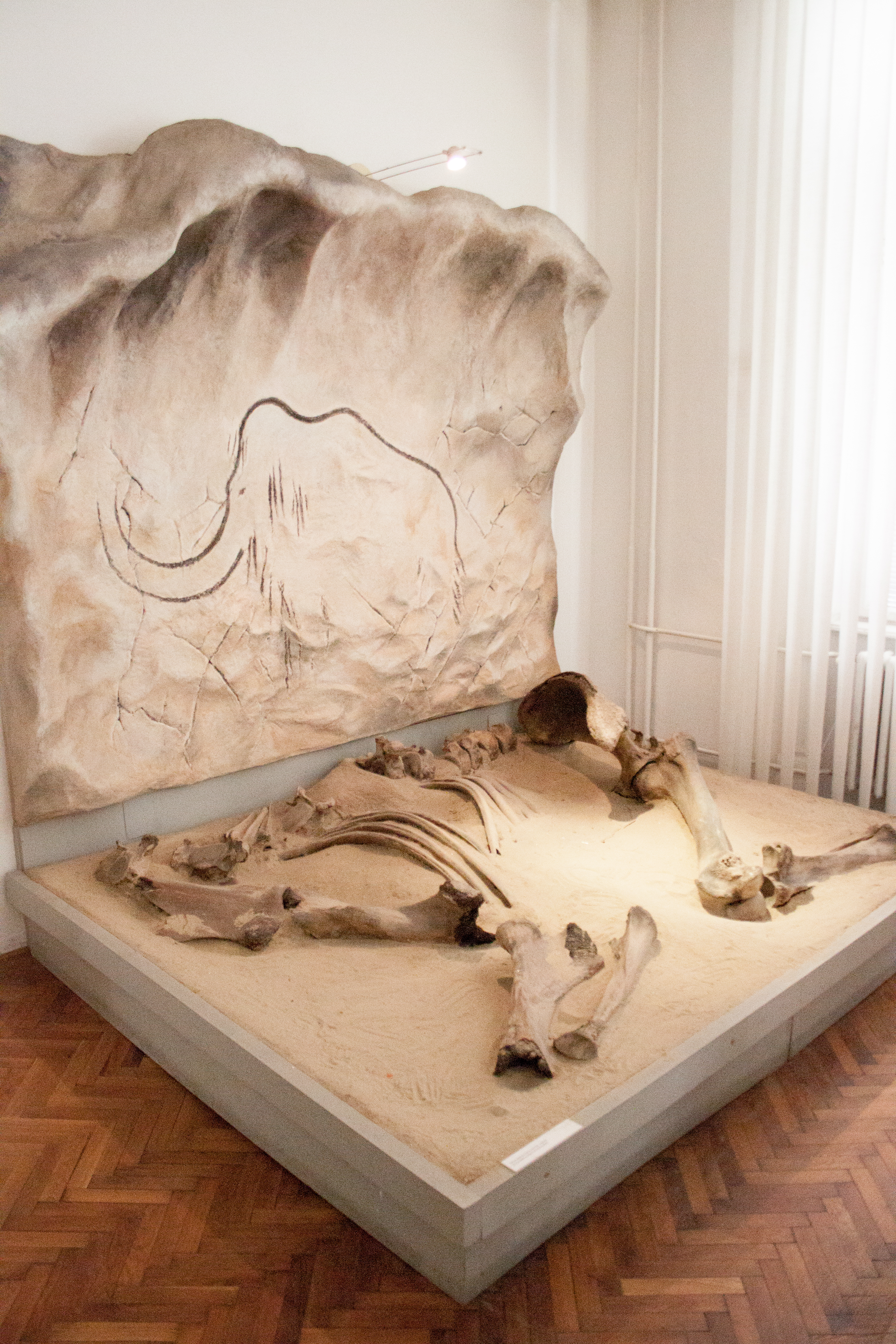
Mammoth bones

"The Košice Centuries" city history permanent exhibit (Mikluš's Prison interiors)

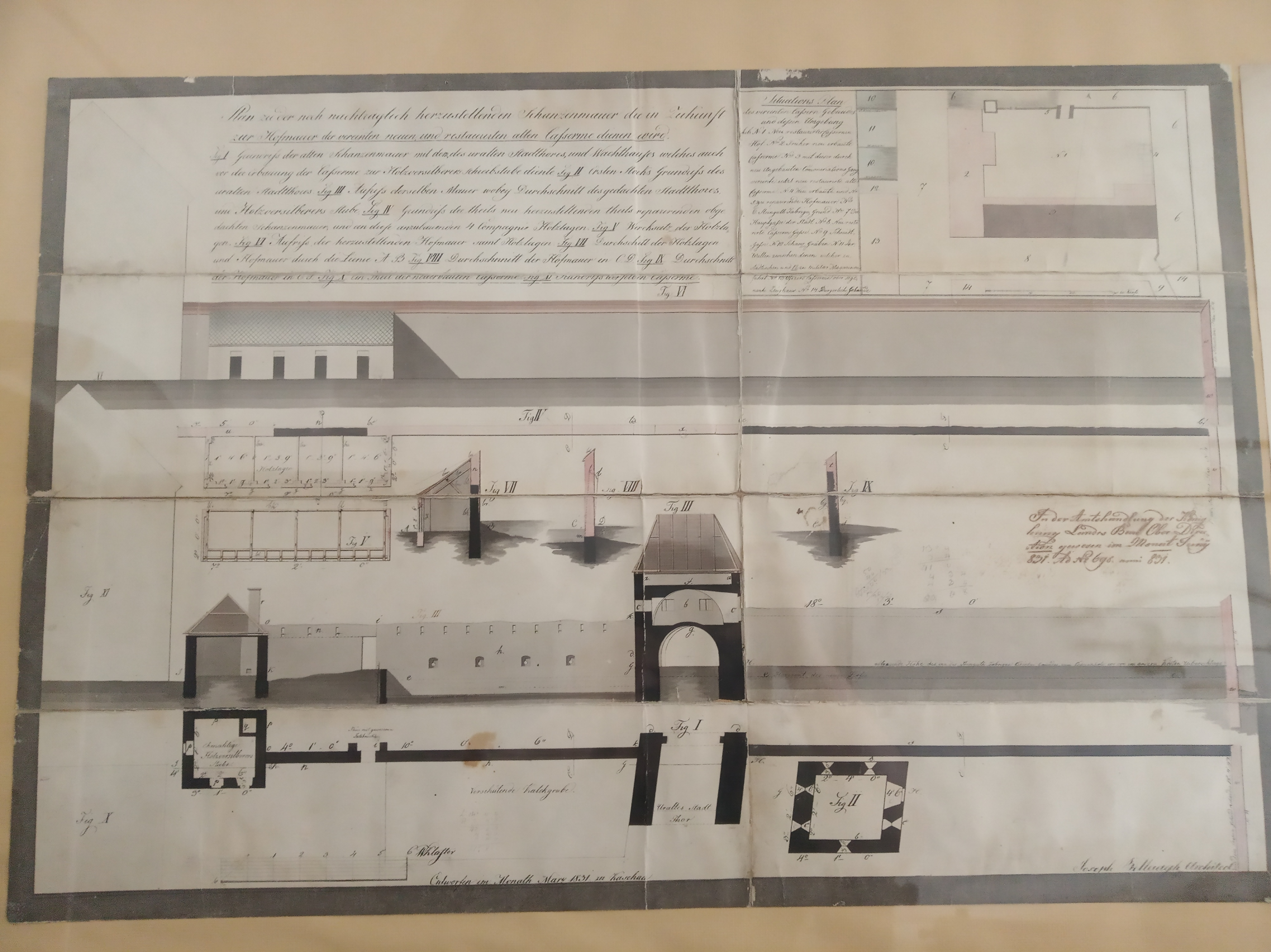
Demolished outer upper city gate of Košice, layout drawing from 1831 (upper floor)

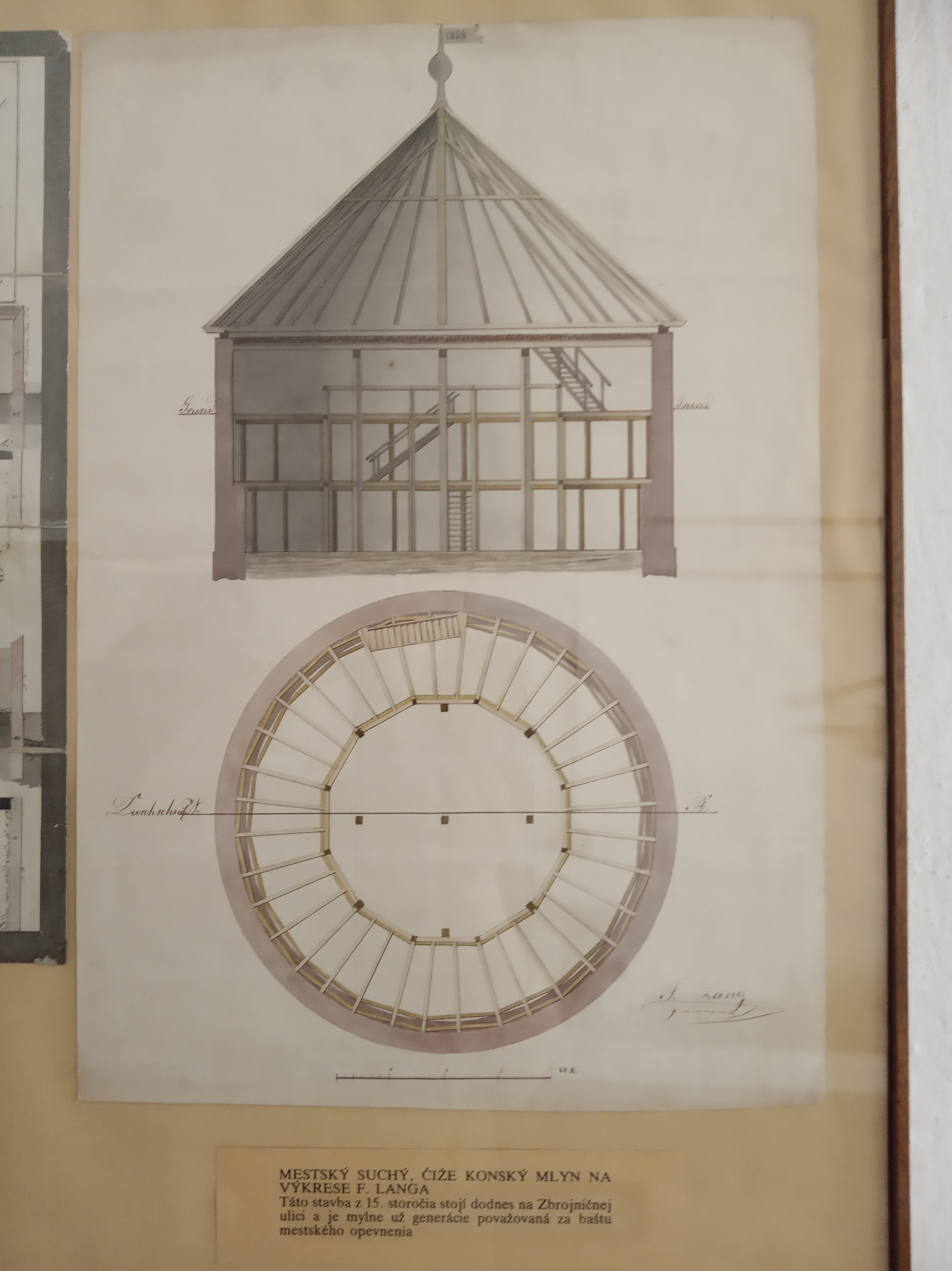
Layout drawing of 15th century horse mill on Zbrojničná street (upper floor)

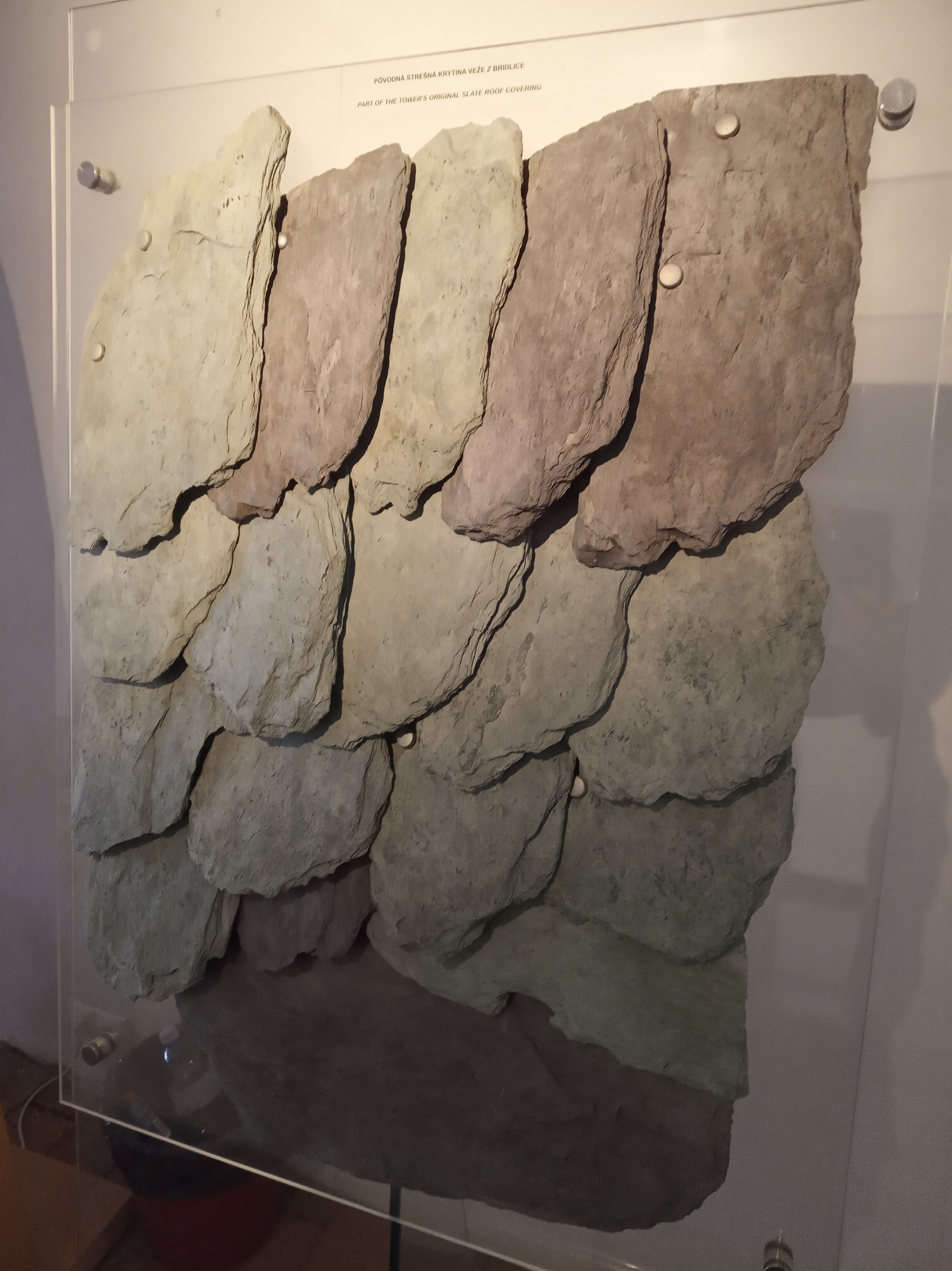
Slate roof tiles from the historical roof of Mikluš's Prison (upper floor)

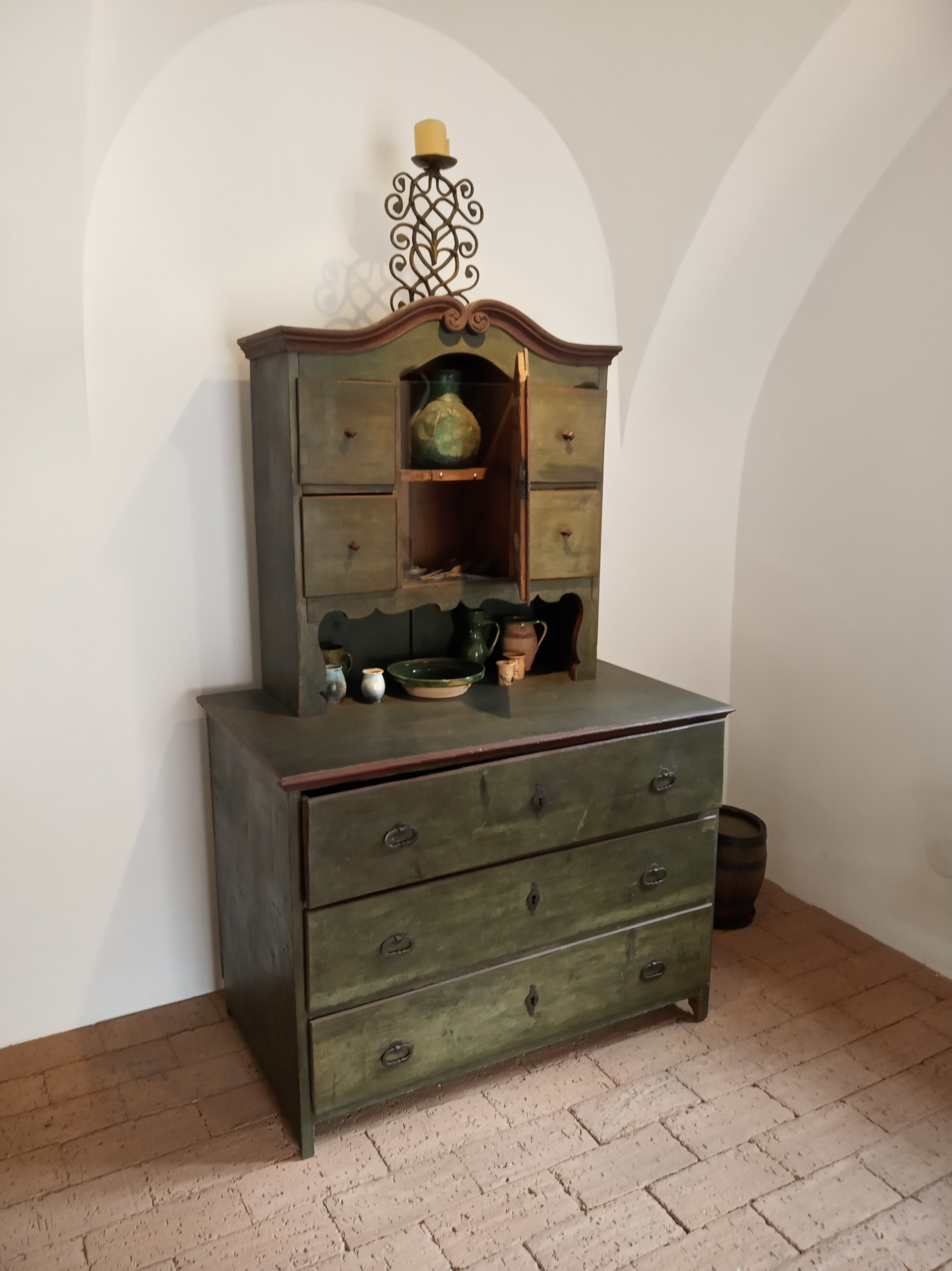
Period cupboard and similar furniture (upper floor)

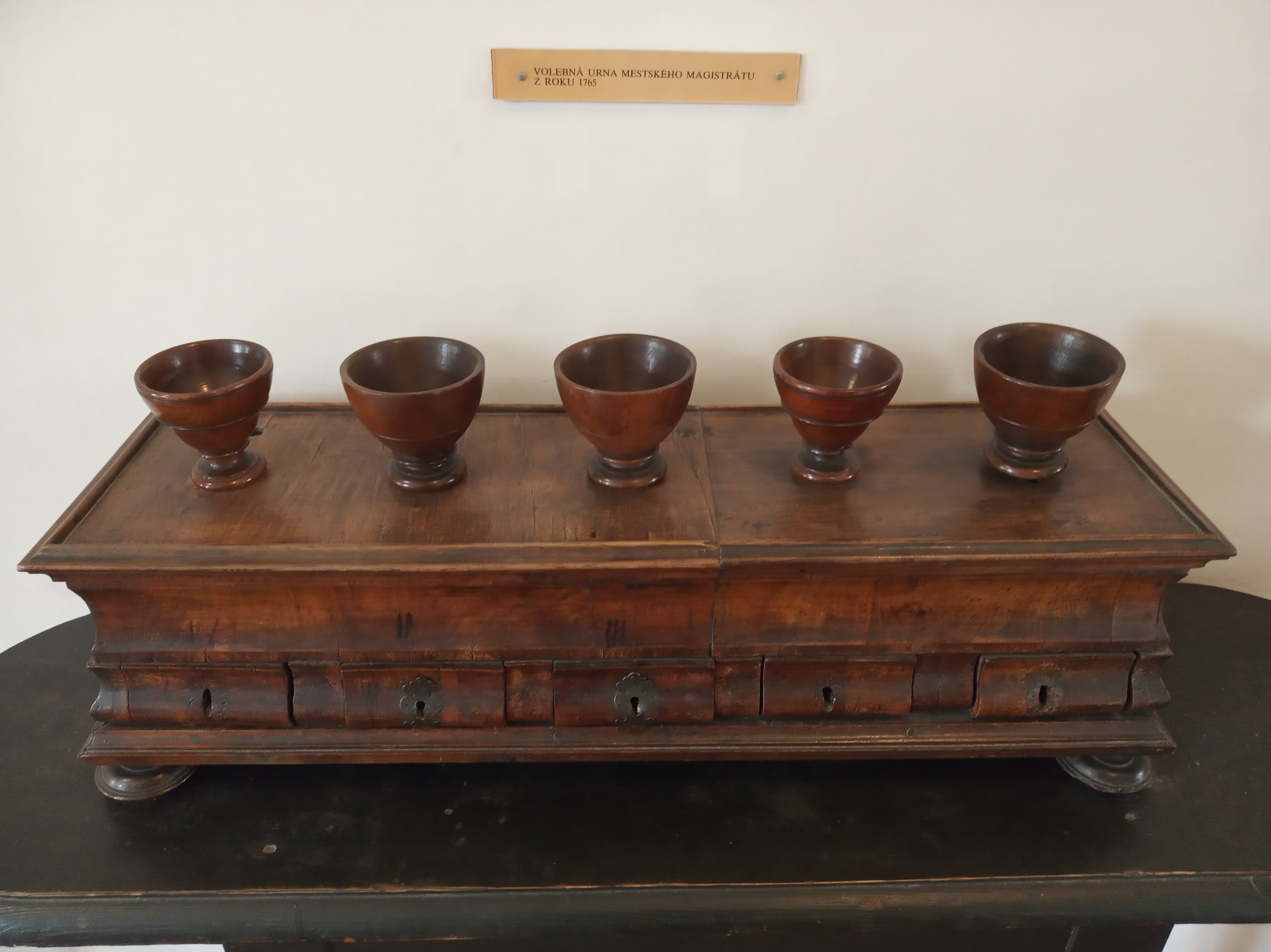
Ballot box for municipal government voting from 1765 (upper floor)

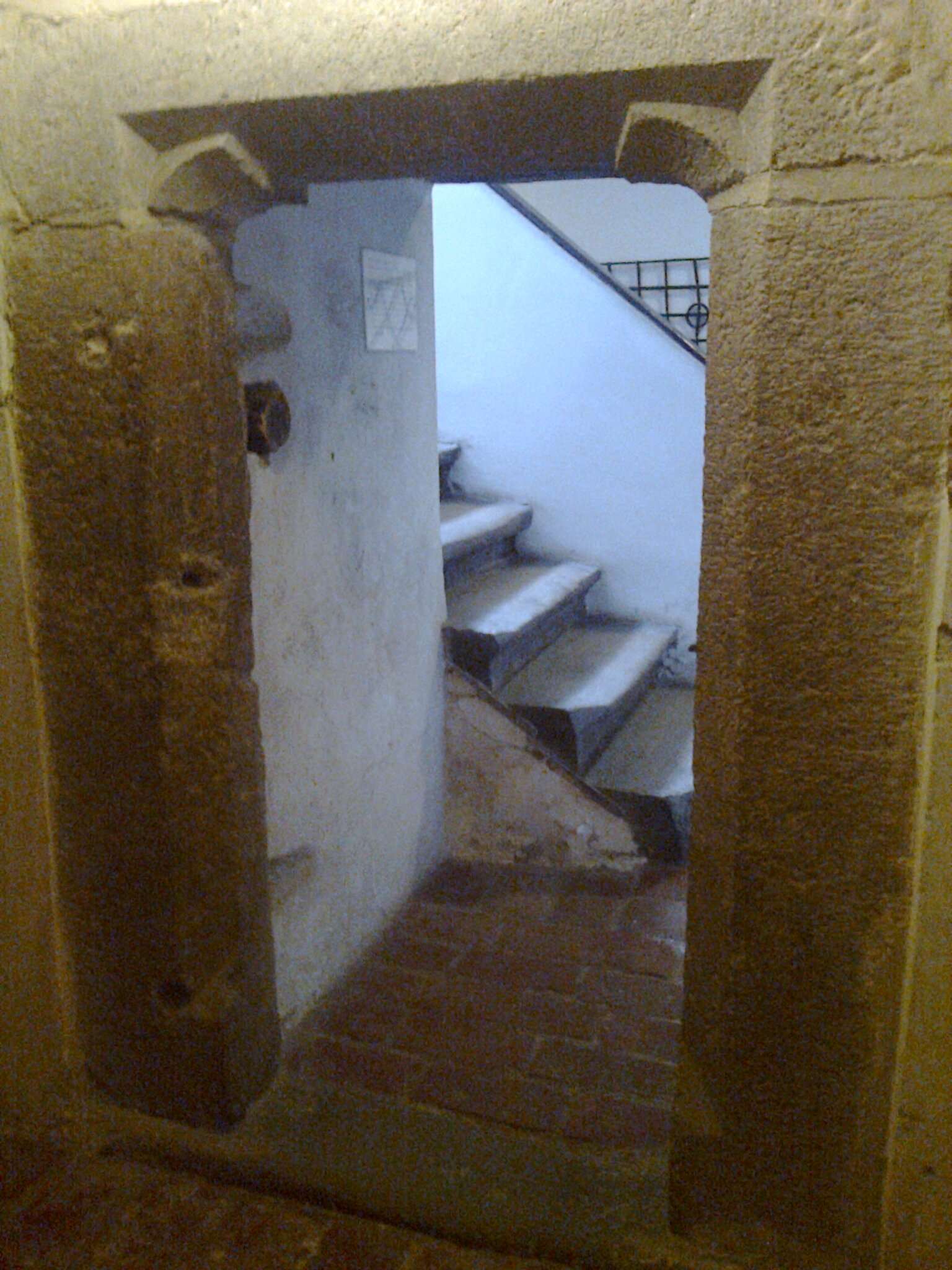
Prison cell doorway and staircase (ground floor)

Fortifications exhibit, Rodošto memorial house and House of Crafts

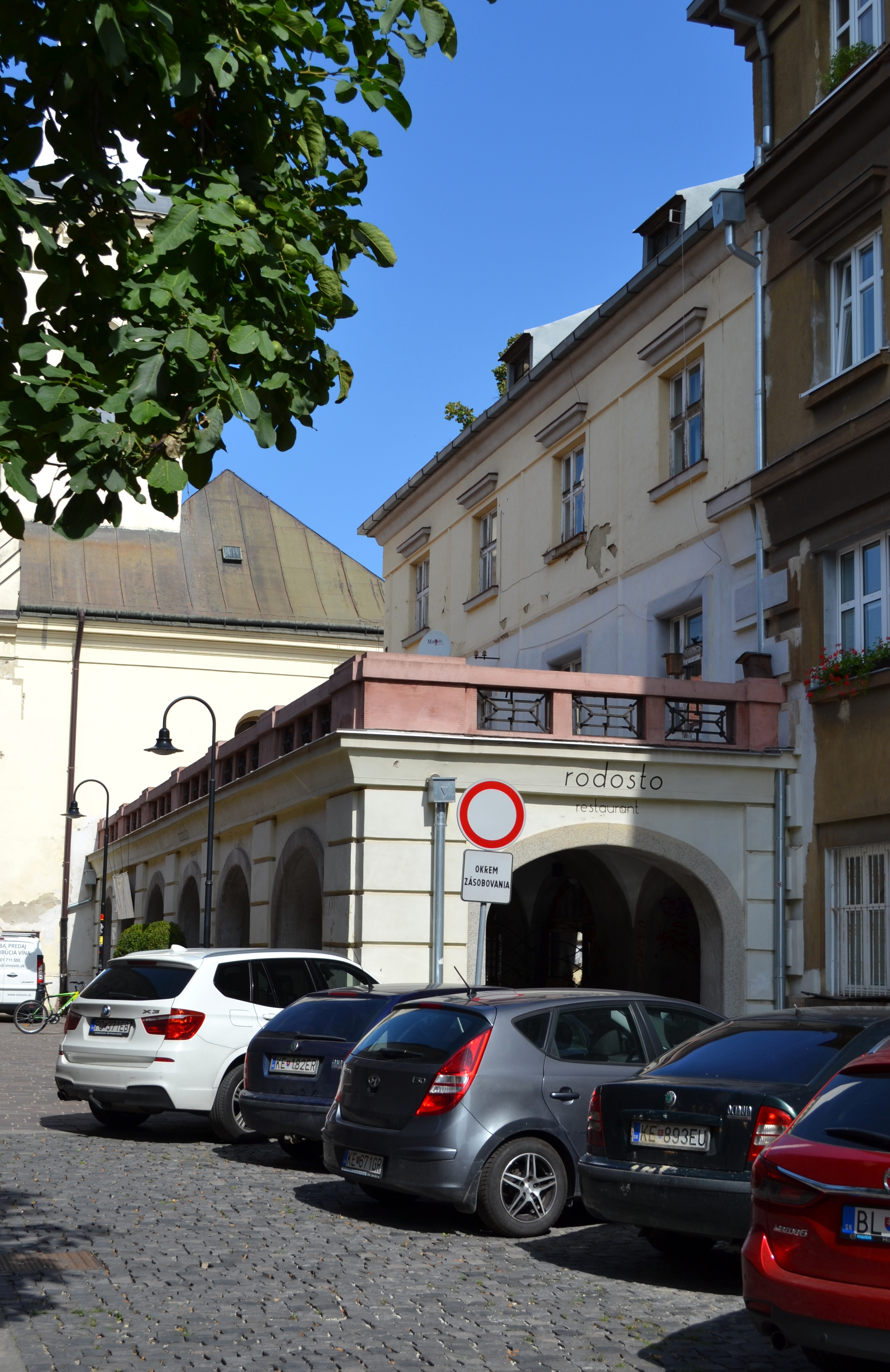
Entrance gate to the Executioner's Bastion complex and courtyard

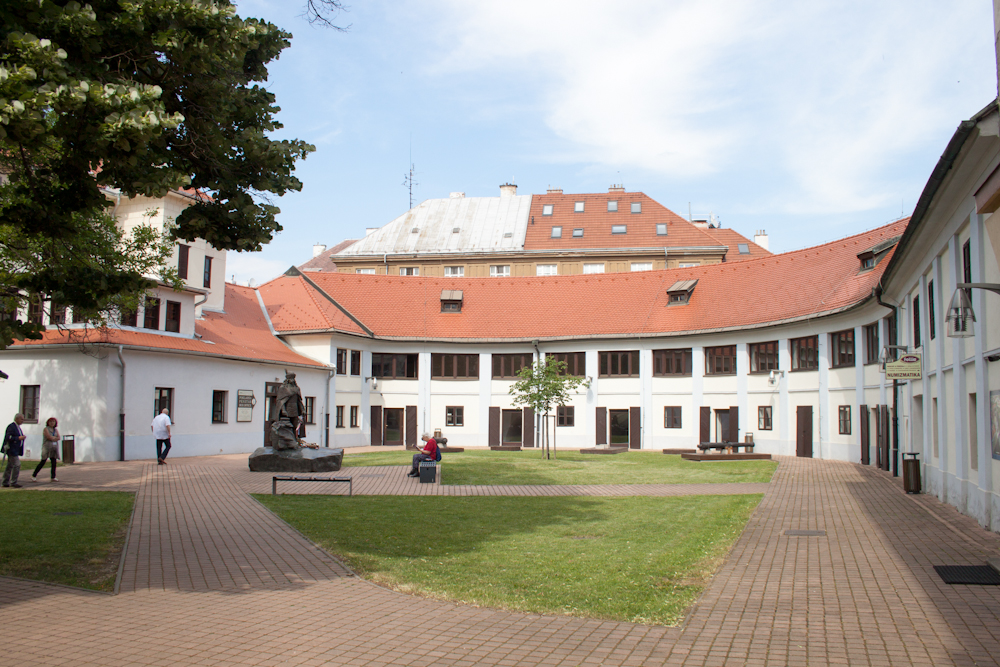
The entire courtyard at the Executioner's Bastion and Rodošto memorial house

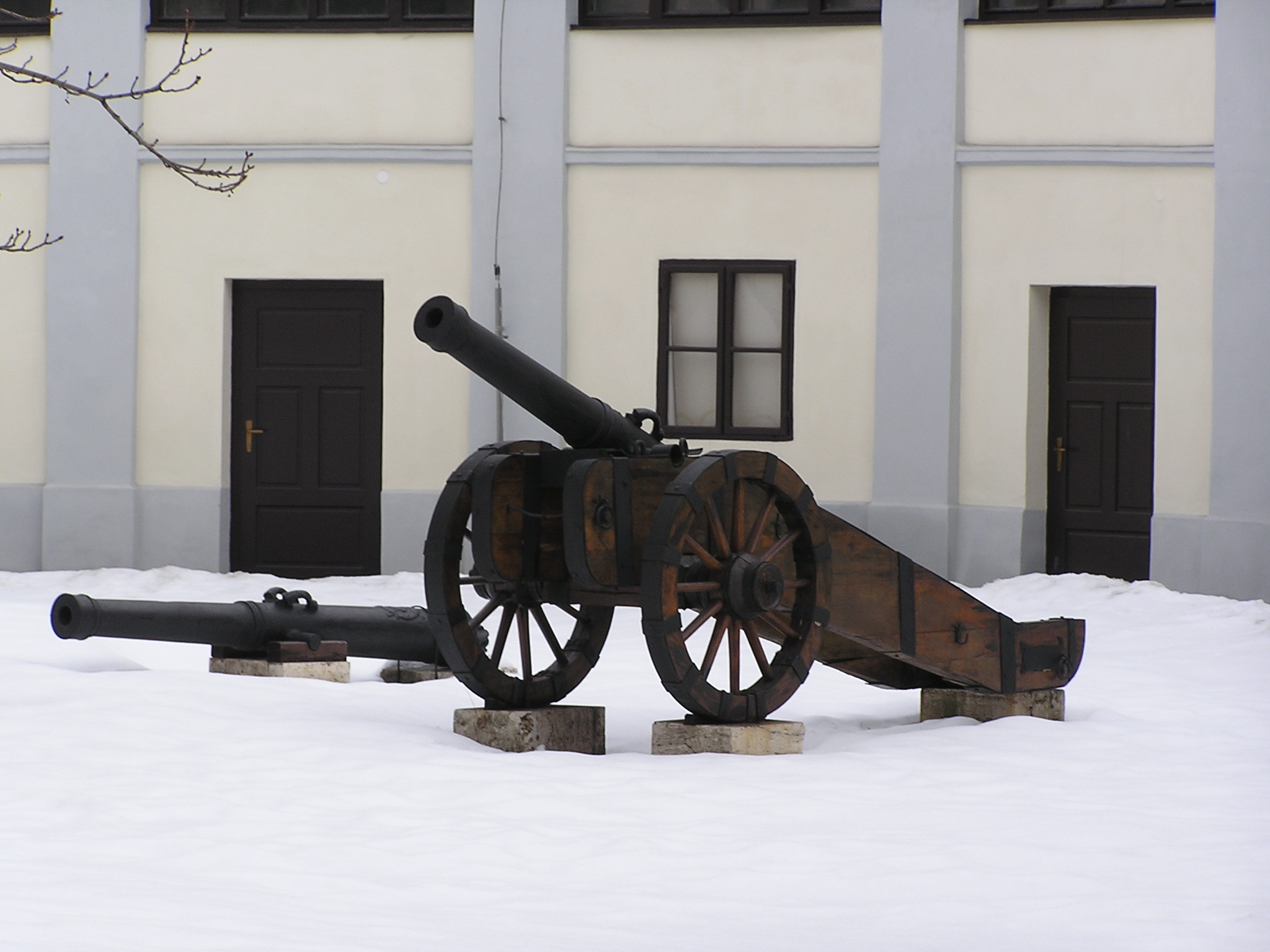
Period cannon at the exhibit's courtyard

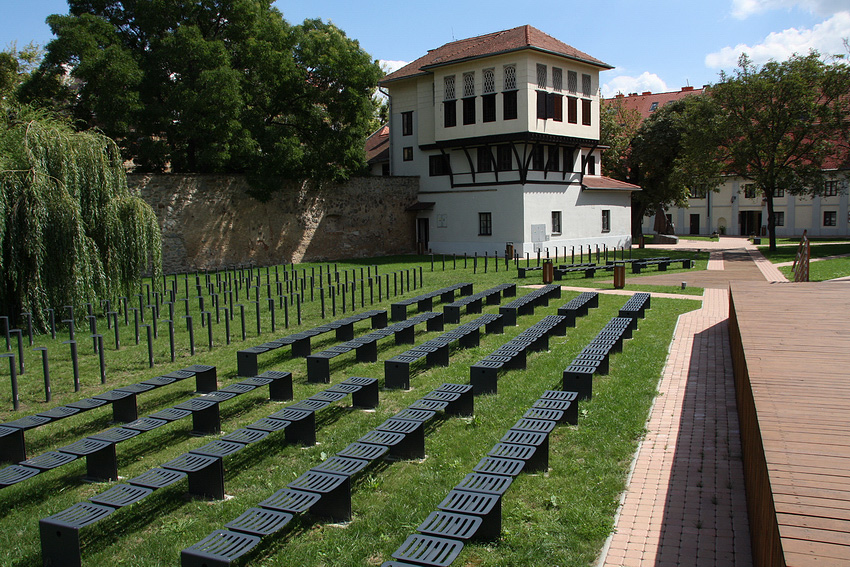
Park near Rodošto memorial house and a section of the city walls

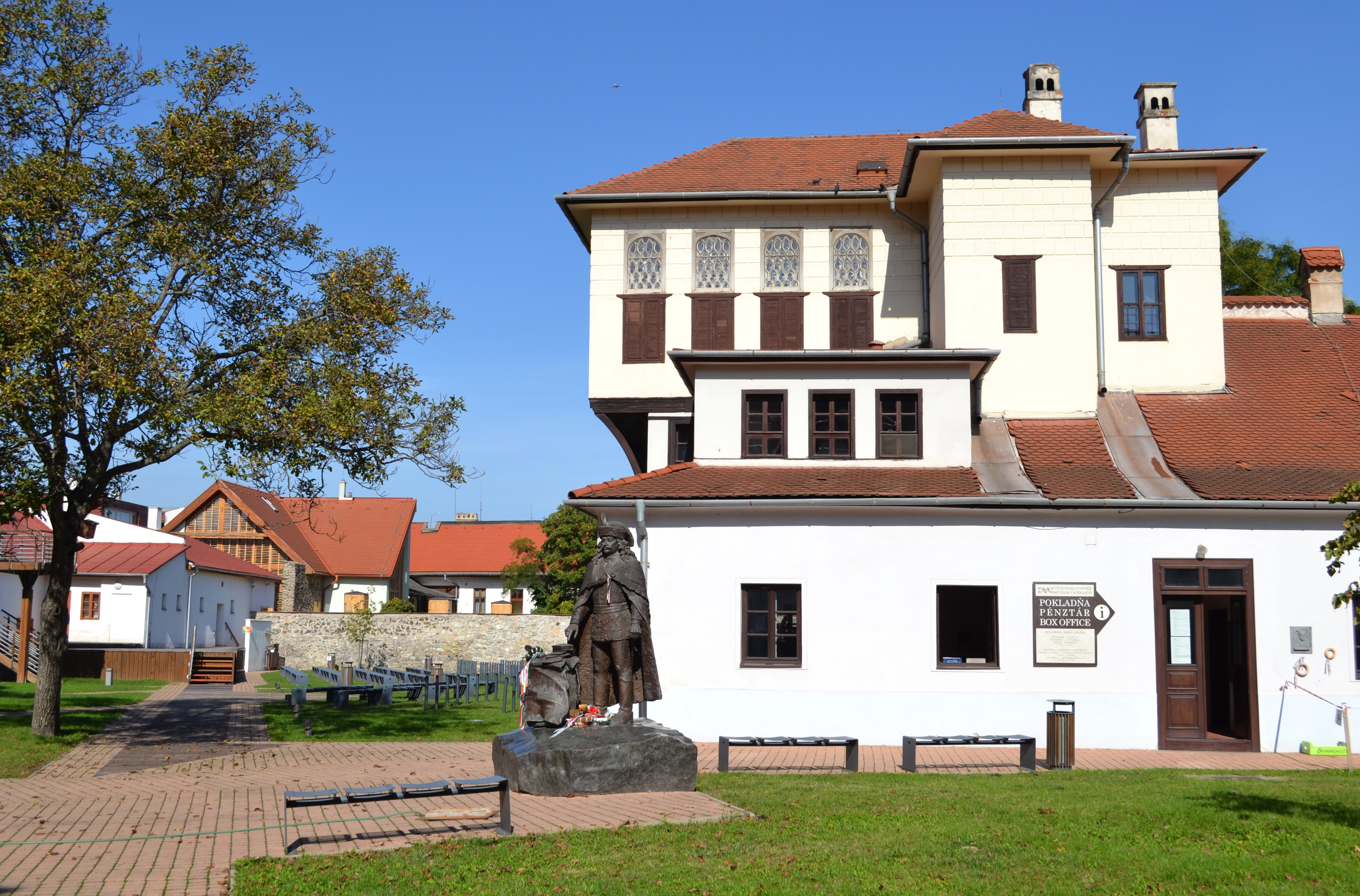
Rodošto memorial house (foreground) and House of Crafts exhibit (background)

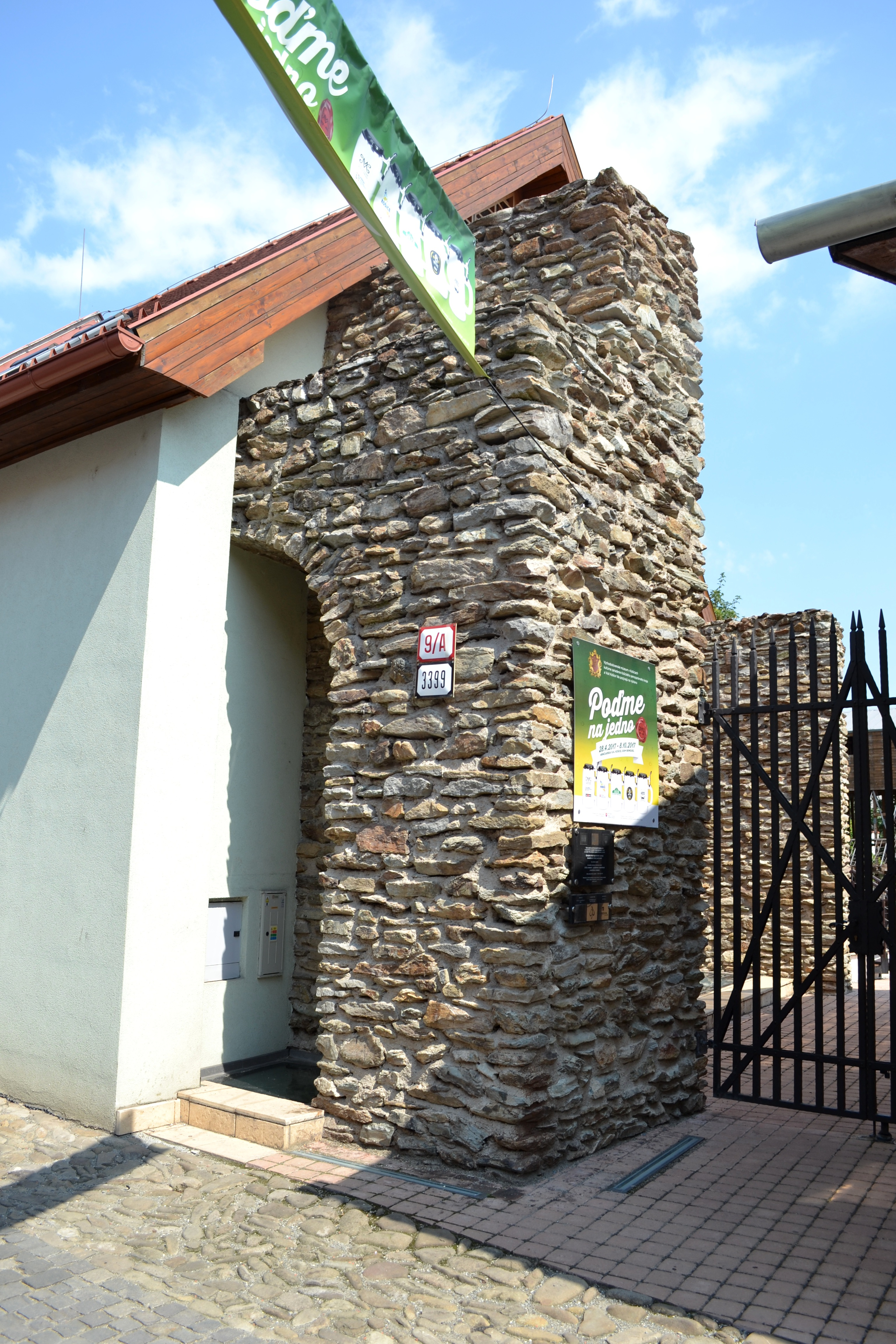
House of Crafts front entrance from further up Hrnčiarska Street

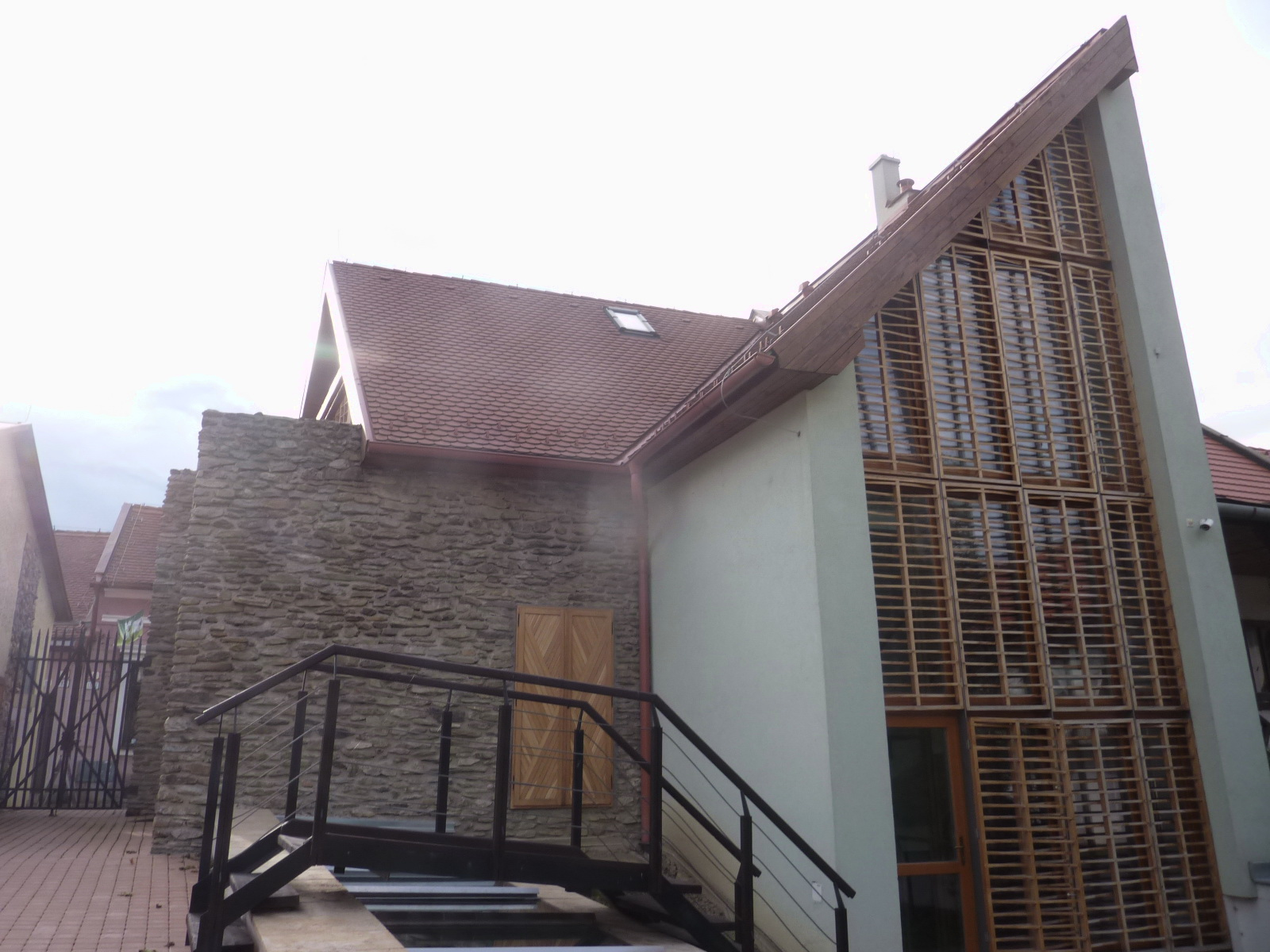
House of Crafts inner courtyard area (beyond the entrance gate), with the exhibition spaces inside

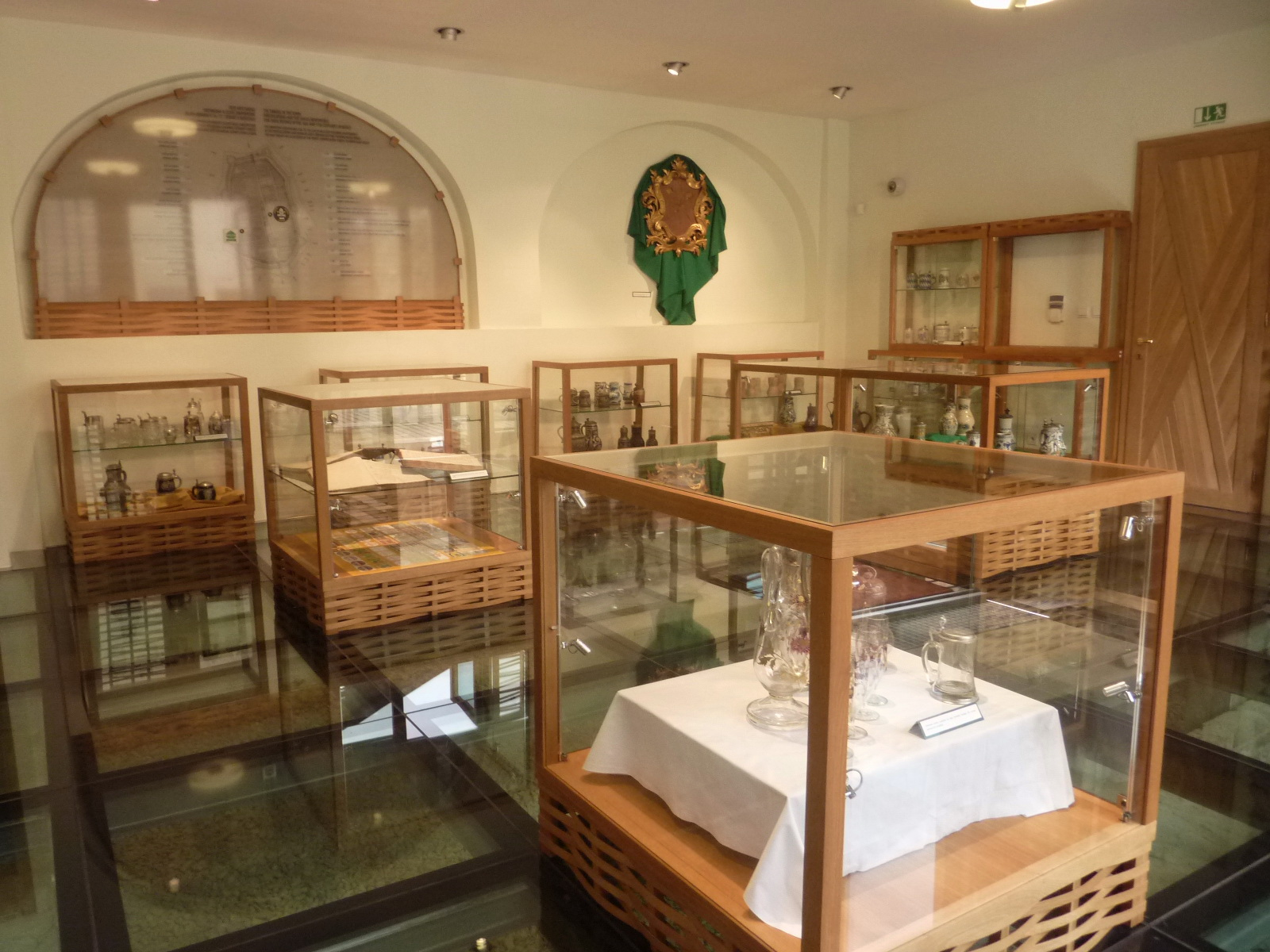
House of Crafts main exhibition room, with a specific 2017 temporary exhibition

== See also ==
- Slovak Technical Museum (Main Street, Košice Old Town)
- East Slovak Gallery (Main Street, Košice Old Town)
