= Cathedral of St. Elizabeth =

Cathedral in Košice, Slovakia

Saint Elizabeth Cathedral Dóm svätej Alžbety Szent Erzsébet-székesegyház
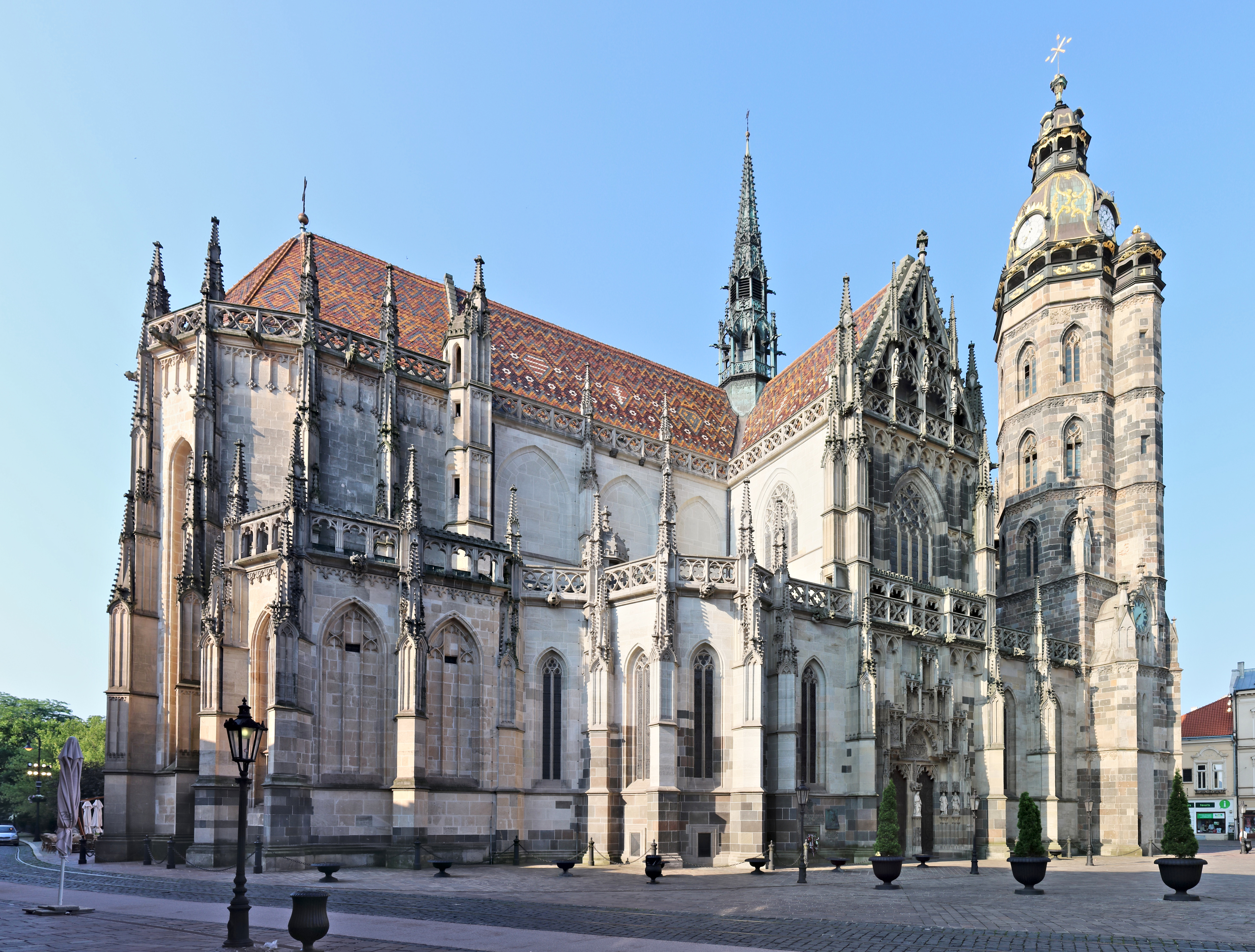
- Cathedral of St. Elizabeth in Košice, Slovakia

Religion
- Affiliation: Catholic
- Diocese: Archdiocese of Košice
- Ecclesiastical or organisational status: Cathedral

Location
- Location: Košice, Slovakia
- Interactive map of Saint Elizabeth Cathedral; Dóm svätej Alžbety; Szent Erzsébet-székesegyház
- Coordinates: 48°43′12.8″N 21°15′29.18″E

Architecture
- Type: Church
- Style: Gothic, Neogothic
- Groundbreaking: 1378
- Completed: 1508

Recording of the Cathedral's bells from 1936

The Cathedral of St. Elizabeth (Slovak: Dóm svätej Alžbety, pronounced [ˈdɔːm ˈsʋɛɐtej ˈalʐbeti]; German: Dom der heiligen Elisabeth), also called Saint Elizabeth Cathedral, is a Gothic cathedral in Košice, Slovakia. It is the largest church in Slovakia and one of the easternmost (Note: The designation of St. Elizabeth's Cathedral as the easternmost cathedral in Europe is especially common in guide literature. Scientific literature omits this primacy. Geographically, the Gothic churches in Transylvania are located further east (and also much further south), but they do not claim this title. In order to maintain the title in Slovakia, hard-to-verify criteria are added, such as: "easternmost cathedral of the western type".) Gothic cathedrals in Europe.

According to historical and archaeological sources, the present-day cathedral was built in the place of an earlier church, which was also consecrated to Saint Elizabeth of Hungary. It was referred to in documents from 1283 and 1290, in which the Bishop of Eger Andrew II spoke about the jurisdiction of the church.

== Description ==
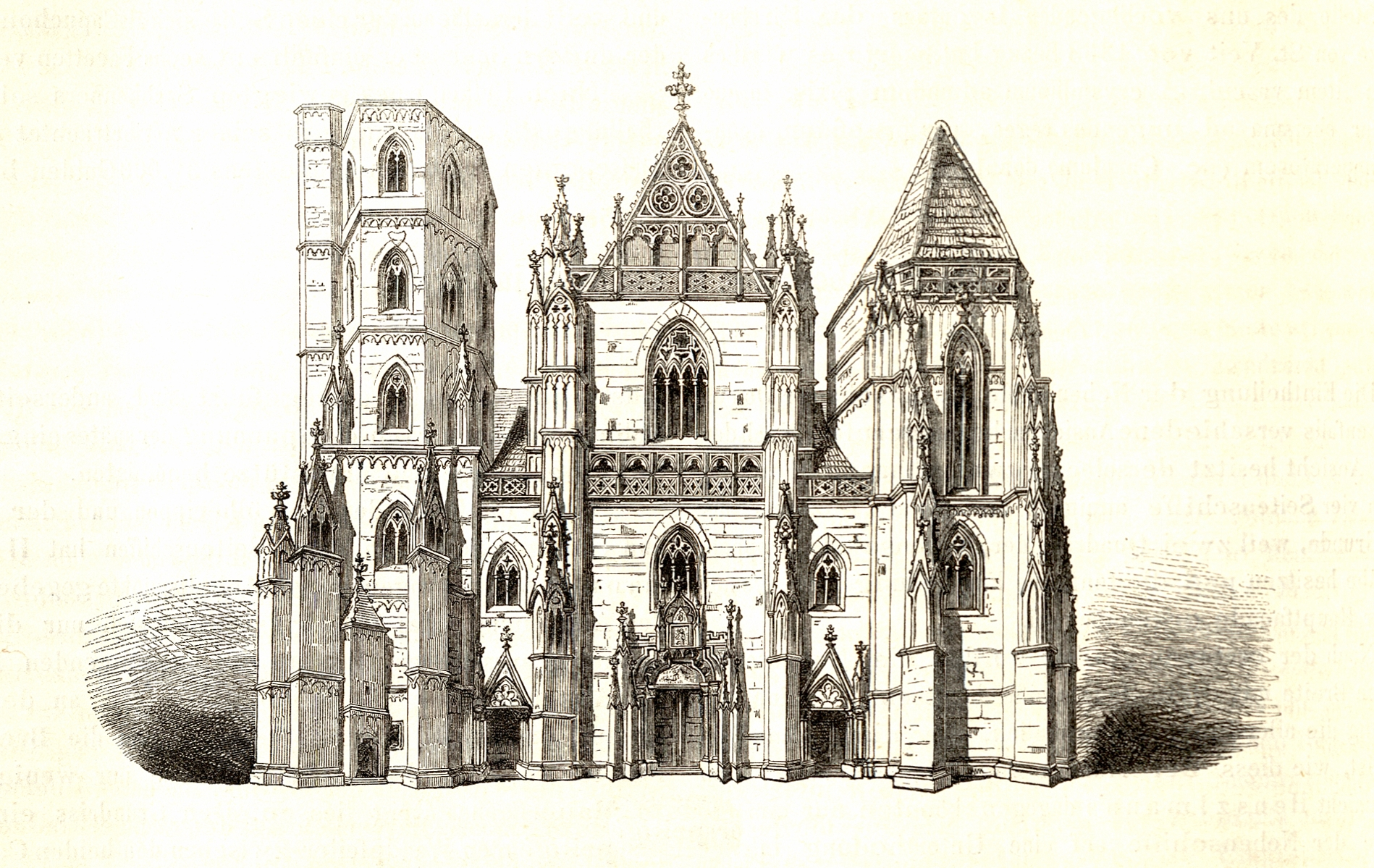
Woodcut of cathedral, 1857

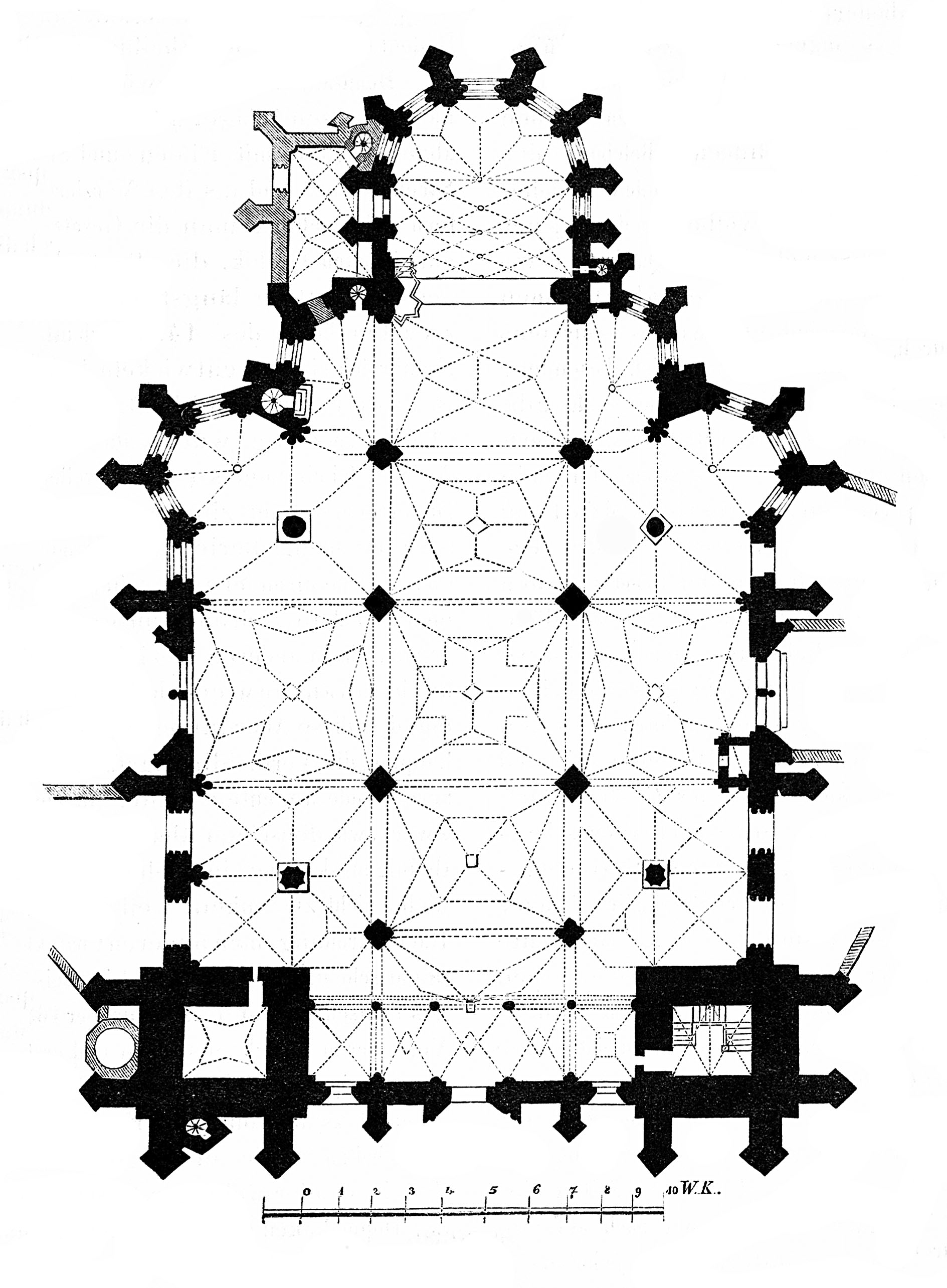
Floor plan, 1857

The Cathedral of St. Elizabeth is the largest church in Slovakia, with a total area of 1,200 square metres (13,000 sq ft) and a capacity of more than 5,000 people. It is the main church in the Archdiocese of Košice, and is one of Europe's easternmost Gothic cathedrals.

The church is 60 metres (200 ft) long and 36 metres (118 ft) wide; the height of the north tower is 59 metres (194 ft). The central nave is 24 metres (79 ft) long, and the aisles are 12 metres (39 ft) long.

The north side of the cathedral includes a five-sided choir, five naves, two towers, and a level sacristy; the south side has two chapels and an antechapel. The cathedral has a unique inside layout, in which the central nave and four aisles are crossed in the middle by one transept of the same height and width as the central nave, which together create a Greek cross.

This large central space rises in the centre of the church, and together with three equal exterior gables with richly decorated portals represent the acme of medieval stonework of art in Central Europe. The complex of the cathedral and adjacent buildings (St Michael Chapel and St Urban Tower) were declared as Cultural Heritage Monuments in 1970.

== History ==
=== Original church ===
The oldest Košice church likely originated in the middle of the 11th century, and was consecrated to Saint Michael. It was built in Romanesque style in the same location as the current church. The oldest record of the original church is dated to 1230. When German colonists settled in Košice in the 1240s, and Saint Elizabeth became the patron saint of the town, the church was rededicated to her.

In the mid-13th century, the church started to be rebuilt in the Gothic style. The church retained its Romanesque tower, but gained a Gothic vault and a side chapel.

The eastward-oriented chapel measured 11.5 by 10.25 metres (37.7 ft × 33.6 ft), with a main aisle of 27.8 by 14 metres (91 ft × 46 ft), giving it a total area of 520 square metres (5,600 sq ft). This parish church burned down around 1380, but it was rebuilt and kept in service until the construction of the current cathedral. Several Romanesque artifacts such as an Iva statuette, a bronze baptistery, and several gravestones remain to this day.

=== First construction stage: 1380–1420 ===
The fire which destroyed the original church in 1380 led to the construction of a new cathedral. Wealthy local citizens financed the construction of the cathedral with the support of Emperor Sigismund of Luxembourg. The construction of the cathedral was also supported by the papal curia. In 1402, Pope Boniface IX issued an indulgence bull stating that all pilgrims who contributed to Košice's church had their sins forgiven. The exact date of the new church's construction is unknown, but happened between 1380 (after the fire) and 1402, when there was a first written record. The first stage of construction likely lasted until 1420.

During this period, the church was built as a five-nave basilica around the original foundation. The south polygonal chevet aisles were built first, followed by the south enclosure wall, the south portal, and the west wall, where the first two levels of both towers were connected. (Note: The polygonal apses of the side naves led to the assumption that the cathedral was supposed to have a five-nave concept. Art historian Václav Mencl cited Xanten Cathedral in Rhineland as a model for the originally intended five-nave floor plan of Košice's Cathedral. This position was challenged by Jozef Duchoň.)

A reference from 1411 indicates that the construction of the cathedral was overseen by a director named Mikuláš and Emperor Sigismund's master builder, Peter from Budin.

=== Second construction stage: 1420–1440 ===
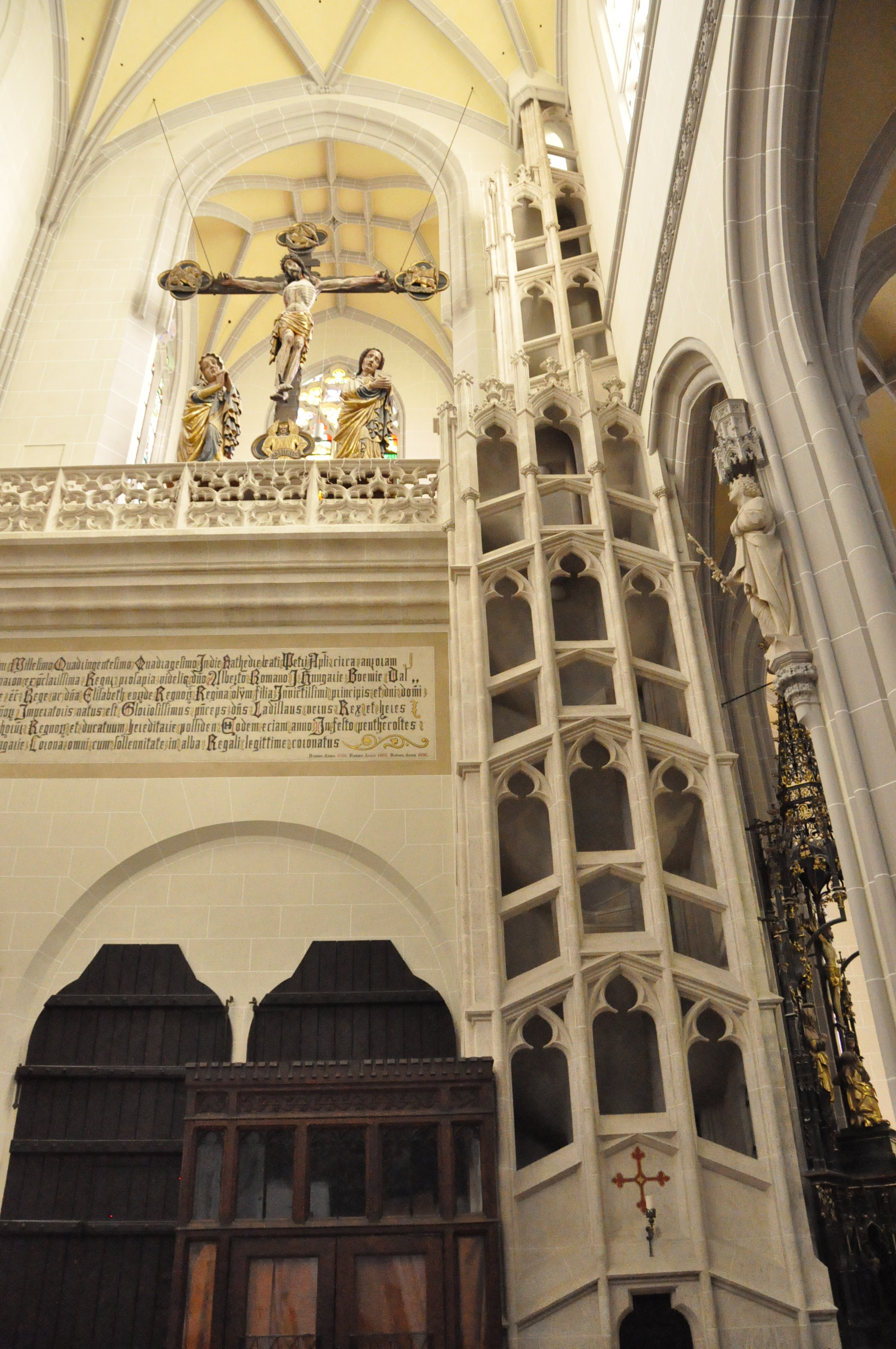
Spiral inner staircase

The use of new construction masonry invented by Peter Parler in 1420 brought about a significant change in the architecture of the cathedral. Because of a lack of written reference, the architect during this stage of construction is unknown. The aims of the design were uprightness, light materials, and spaciousness. This resulted in the construction of the three-aisle cathedral, and, in a major change of plan, counter aisles were added to the main nave.

This addition was unconventionally situated in the middle of the main nave length, and a unique central hall space was created. The portal decorations of the main nave and side aisles were inspired by Gothic buildings in Prague and Kraków, and were included in the second construction stage. The influence of Parler's masonry at Saint Vitus Cathedral of Prague became evident in the King's Oratory and its spiral staircase, as well as in a motif of round banisters of the oratory and a stone gallery over the sacristy.

The construction of the cathedral continued with the creation of the north external wall, the polygonal chevet of the north aisle (parallel to the south apsis), and the eight-sided top levels of Sigismund's Tower. At the end of the second construction stage, the cathedral was ready for vaulting, and it was necessary to pull down the old church. St Michael's church (today called St Michael's Chapel) started construction at the same time as the new cathedral, but was finished in 1400, and so took over the function of a parish church.

=== Third construction stage: 1440–1462 ===
After the demolition of the old church, the new cathedral was vaulted using a rib vault. The particular symmetric shapes of the vault differed from bay to bay, and they were not folded from one bay to the other. The newest part of the construction, the sacristy and chapel, were done during this third stage.

Sigimund's tower was finished and a new town emblem, granted by Ladislaus the Posthumous, was sculpted on the fifth floor of tower in 1453. The date "1462" is marked over the entrance, marking the year when work on the tower was completed.

=== Fourth construction stage: 1462–1490 ===
After finishing Sigimund's tower, attention turned to the construction of the south tower. This tower was named after Matthias Corvinus, the monarch at the time and significant contributor to the building of tower. Because of the use of new masonry, this tower was built in a more decorated and vertical style than the north tower. During this time, the south shield and portal were completed.

Between 1464 and 1490, Master Stephan Lapicidus, also referred to as Master Štefan Staimecz from Košice, was in charge of the construction. Master Štefan built side aisle that were not originally included in the floor plan, a change which was financed by rich city-dwelling families. The Saint Cross Chapel was built by senator August Cromer in 1475, and the Saint Maria chapel was built by Satmary Rod in 1477. By the end of the 15th century, the Saint Joseph Chapel (which no longer exists) was built on the north side of the cathedral.

Some inside features from this period are the work of Master Štefan, such as the stone pastophorium and the relief of St. Elizabeth on the sacristy wall. At that time, the church was furnished with Gothic pieces, of which little remains today. The altar of Saint Elisabeth, constructed between 1474 and 1477 by an unknown artist, has been preserved.

=== Final construction stage: 1491–1508 ===
Following Matthias Corvinus' death in 1490, Hungary experienced a period of unrest and conflict. Polish–Lithuanian regent John I Albert attacked the city of Košice and fired upon it with cannons. The cathedral was heavily damaged in the attack, and Nikolaus Krumpholz of Niš was charged with its reconstruction, with master builder Vaclav of Prague assisting him. According to documents from the time, the reconstruction took place between 1496 and 1498.

The presbytery was completed in 1508; this is considered to be the year when the cathedral's construction was finished. This is documented by a scroll dated from 1508 in the name of master builder Krumpholz, which was found in the presbytery pillar after a major renovation in 1908.

=== Reformation period ===
In 1556, a fire burned through much of Košice, damaging the cathedral in the process. The roof and its timbers, along with a large section of the interior, were burnt. Repairs to the cathedral were done by master builder Stanislaus of Kraków, master builders Johann and Gebriel, and stone master Matyas.

After the renovations, the cathedral was administered by Protestants, who controlled it until 1604 when they were violently removed by Catholics and members of Eger's chapter house. This incident became one of the main reasons for the anti-Habsburg revolt of Stephen Bocskai, who gave the cathedral to the Calvinists.

The cathedral was returned to Eger's chapter house in 1671 by order of Emperor Leopold I. General repairs were undertaken, and the chapter house's treasure was placed in the cathedral. During Count Imre Thököly de Késmárk's revolt in 1682, the cathedral was again taken over by Protestants. In 1685, the cathedral was permanently restored to the Catholic community.

=== Baroque period ===
In 1706, the cathedral was damaged during an occupation by Francis II Rákóczi. The west and the south side of the cathedral were the most badly damaged. During the 18th century, several parts of the cathedral were repaired, and further embellishments were added.

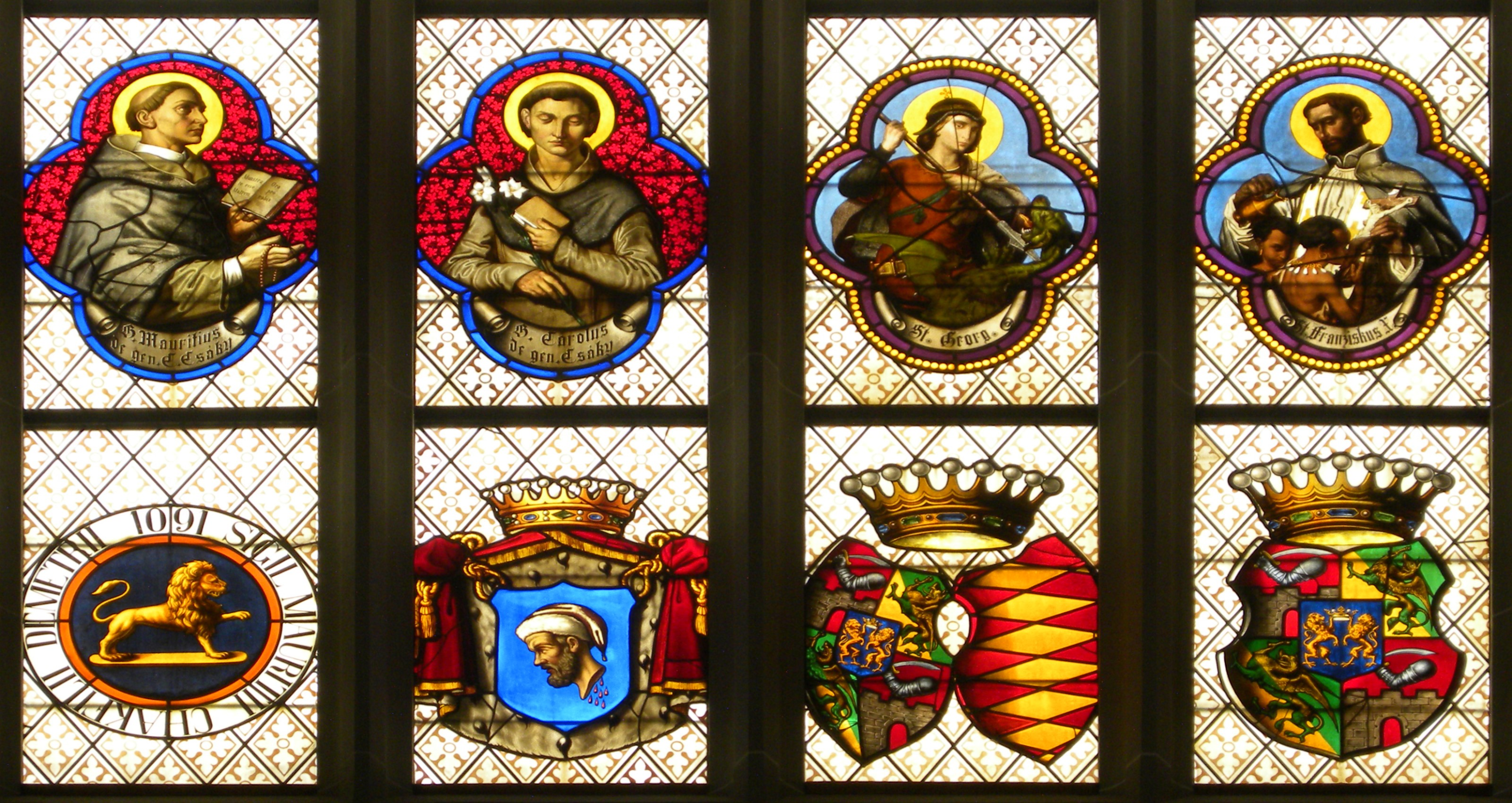
Stained glass window in the transept

By the second half of the 18th century, the cathedral had 14 altars, of which only 10 exist today.

=== Fábry's reconstruction: 1858–1863 ===
After several years of religious wars and neglected maintenance, it became necessary to update the cathedral at the beginning of the 19th century. Following earthquakes in 1834 and 1845, the town was flooded, which damaged several parts of the ground pavement in the cathedral. During the 19th century, there was an initiative for the cathedral to be reconstructed in neo-Gothic style, which was organised by Bishop Ignác Fábry and artist Imre Henszlmann.

In 1857, the St. Elizabeth Cathedral Alliance was established and undertook repairs from 1856 to 1863 under the control of the Emperor's Royal Central Commission of Preservation and Repair of Architectural Monuments, with the assistance of Henszlmann.

Works were laid out by master builders Károly Gerster and Lajos Frey. Fábry's reconstruction altered several portals' statues, changed clapboards to ceramic roof-tiles, replaced the stock of new window panes, and undertook repairs of the south hall and interior painting.

Despite the reconstruction, several structural defects of the cathedral evident at that time were not repaired. Some of the columns were off-center from their central line, and their bases were standing on a colour blade layer which was soaked by ground water. Arch ruptures were covered by mortar or were covered by wood. These incomplete repairs led to more damage as a result of a heavy windstorm in 1875.

=== Major reconstruction: 1877–1896 ===
In 1872, the Hungarian Temporary Monuments Commission was established, with Imre Henszlmann as the commission secretary. A major reconstruction was undertaken from 1877 to 1896 and was the main priority of the Monuments Commission. It was financed mostly from the state budget of the Hungarian government. Imre Steindl, a professor of Medieval Architecture at Budapest Technical University and a well-known Hungarian neo-Gothic architect, was named as the main architect of the reconstruction works.

Steindl determined that, based on ruptures visible in arches, the location of the pillars in the aisles was the primary contributor to the structural damage present in the cathedral. Steindl developed a new structure to address these issues, and the three-aisle cathedral was rebuilt to a five-aisle cathedral via additional arches in the side aisles. Additionally, medieval star arches in the main and side aisles were rebuilt as network ones. An old choir was removed, and in its place Steindl built expanded replicas with more pillars. Parts of the exterior of the cathedral were also rebuilt, such as an adjustment to the external walls and gavels, and repairs to supporting columns, water-chutes, windows, and portals. The roof of the Matthias Tower was also rebuilt.

During this time, the late-Gothic St Joseph's Chapel was completely removed. A neo-Gothic flèche was also added. Steindl's plan was to rebuild all the neo-Gothic components of the cathedral, but this was denied by the commission who instead requested that old stone constructions be replaced with new ones. Rebuilding the towers in the Gothic style was not realized largely due to a lack of funds, which was also reflected in the use of cheaper construction material. For structural repairs between 1878 and 1882, cheap but low-quality sandstone from the nearby Spiššké Vlachy stone pit was used. This stone quickly degraded and resulted in the removal of pinnacles and gargoyles from the outer surface because they endangered pedestrians. In the next phase of reconstruction beginning in 1882, higher quality sandstone from Banská Bystrica was used.

The master builder from 1877 to 1880 was Josepf Weber, followed by Friedrich Wilhelm Fröde from 1880 to 1896. The work was originally supervised by Austrian architect Friedrich von Schmidt, followed by Imre Steindl. In 1885, Steindl was commissioned to work on the Hungarian Parliament Building and Otto Sztehló took over as the architect for the cathedral. Sztehló used different methods which allowed him to preserve the original Gothic architecture. As a result, Sigismund's Tower, the Matthias Tower (except the roof), the inner side of exterior walls, the medieval portals with reliefs, the stone inventory of interior, and the whole chapel were kept in their original form.

In 1896, new neo-Gothic interior furnishings (altars, statues, pictures) were bought and donated to Košice's Cathedral by the Hungarian clergy, the Bishop of Kassa, and Zsigmond Bubics (a wealthy patron). In 1906, a crypt was built under the north side aisle according to the plan of Hungarian architect Frigyes Schulek. This crypt was prepared to contain the relics of Francis II Rákóczi and his companions from the Ottoman Empire.

=== Second major reconstruction: 1978–present ===
In 1970, the Cathedral of St. Elizabeth was declared a National Cultural Monument. By this time, most of the external architectural features (pinnacles, gargoyles, gadroons) had been either destroyed by rainwater or removed. The stone decoration on the north portal was also heavily weathered. Repairs started in September 1978.

At the same time, a large initiative was undertaken to restore and preserve culturally significant monuments in Košice. As part of this, the main street which passed in front of the cathedral was closed to vehicle traffic in 1984, and then to trams in 1986.

During the reconstruction, the decision was made to preserve and restore as much of the 19th-century reconstruction as possible. The roof of the main and side aisles was repaired using ceramic-coloured enamel tiles with the original 19th-century pattern. The flèche was reconstructed, and 264 pieces of lead decorations were added.

From 1980 to 1992, the most damaged parts of the chapel and sacristy were reconstructed. The work was done by the Polish company Polskie Pracownie Konserwacji Zabytków, from Vratislav. The gadroons, gargoyles, and pinnacles were rebuilt along with the staircase towers. The gargoyles' reconstruction was done according to original medieval patterns. This reconstruction included repairing the interior of the chapel.

From 1992 to 1995, the south facade was cleaned and preserved. Sigismund's Tower had its rococo copper helmet replaced between 1995 and 1997. Original interior decorations from 1775 were cleaned and restored during this time. In 2008, reconstruction of the Rákóczi crypt was finished, and in 2009, reconstruction of the northernmost portal was finished.

Today, renovation work is being done to the exterior of the north facade and interior of the crossed north aisle. The Matthias Tower is currently awaiting repairs also.

== Architecture ==
The main form of the cathedral consists of a central nave with five bays, divided by the cross aisle with one bay. The foundation of the cathedral shows an apparent alternate floor plan with four subordinate spaces, inserted between the arms of main and cross aisle. It is probable that this change occurred during early construction, after the enclosure walls were built and the main outline of space was finished.

In the next few years, the design of portals and arches were decided. In the original architecture, the stone sculptures from 1420 to 1440 were enhanced by the construction of three large portals. The north, the south, and west portals in Košice have complex profiles, consisting of dynamic curves, alternating horizontal and vertical cornices, and decorative pinnacles.

=== Vaulting ===
As illustrated by Mencl's reconstruction, the conception of the figural vaulting is based on individual parts of the split arcades' curves and inter vaultings. The difficult play of these shapes is inspired by the sun rising, with its spikes out of the splitting columns. The middle of each sun motif has an individual pattern. From its diagonal vectors, it creates cross, rhombus, and trapezoid shapes.

In the subordinate spaces—which are adjacent to the arms of the main Greek cross formed by the main aisle and the side aisle—at connecting walls and the east side, the sun scheme is lost in a tangle of cranked rib networks. In the late 1400s, Master Štefan built a sacrarium over the anteroom at the south wall and was adding adoration to the chapel of St Cross to its east side and chapel of Mettercia to the west side.

Near the chapel of St Joseph on the north side, the ribs converge but do not reach the capital of the lisena (e.g. pilaster). The vaulting of the chapels is based on an irregular star net vault.

=== Windows ===
Master Ján of Prešov demolished old walls and suggested an atrial type of window, which can be seen mostly at the triple aisle. From an artistic point of view, he used the reflective efficiency of the smooth walls and large windows to whiten the interior.

==== Window heraldry ====
The stained-glass windows between the main altar and the west gate are decorated with heraldries of Košice, Abov's chair, and Hunyady chair. The windows also contain the heraldry of the countries ruled by 15th-century King Matthias Corvinus: Dalmatia, The Big Bulgaria, Transylvania, Hungary, Serbia, Slavonia, Croatia, Bohemia, Moravia, and Silesia.

== Interior ==
=== Altars ===
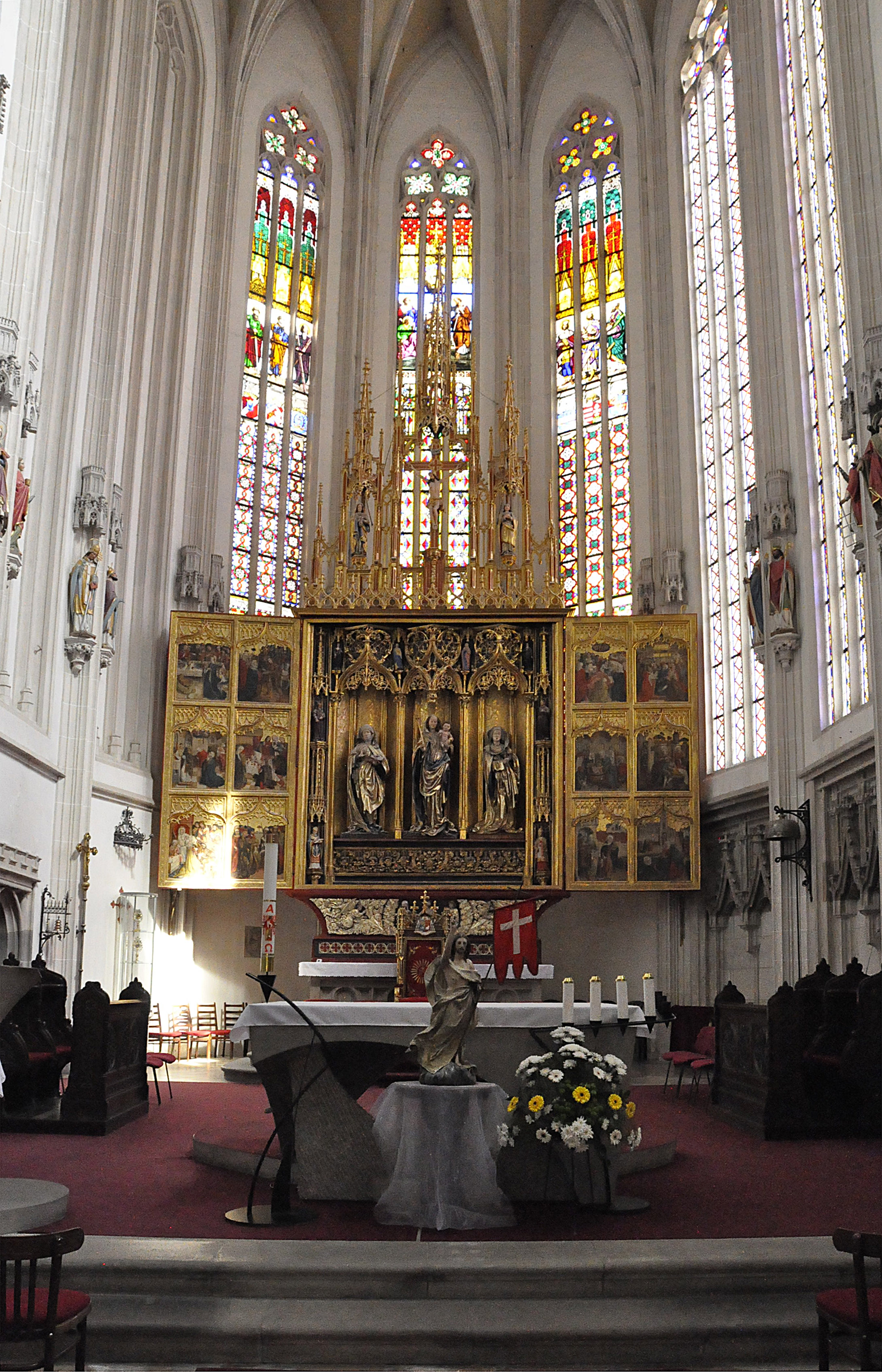
Altar of Saint Elizabeth

==== The Main Altar of Saint Elizabeth ====
This altar was built between 1474 and 1477 and is ranked among the most remarkable pieces of medieval art in Slovakia. It consists of two pairs of decorated wings, each containing six Gothic paintings, with a heavily decorated centerpiece. As a whole, it is a set of 48 paintings in three themed cycles – Elizabethan, the Passion, and the Advent. This style of altar is unique across Europe.

==== Altar of the Visitation ====
The winged altar was crafted to the order of a rich merchant of Košice named Michal Gunthert in 1516. The guiding motif of the altar, located in the arche, is a sculpture of the visitation of Mary to Elizabeth. On both sides, the altar has a pair of movable wings. When opened, they represent scenes of the Angelical salutation, the Nativity, the Adoration of the Magi, and the flight into Egypt.

When closed, they depict the sacred personages of Saint Catherine, Saint John the Baptist, Saint Barbara, and Saint John the Apostle. The predella is painted with votives of vir dolōrum, Virgin Mary, Saint John the Evangelist, Saint Michael the Archangel, and Saint Margaret the Virgin.

The latter were patrons of the Gunthert family. Like the main altar of Saint Elizabeth, the upper part of this altarpiece is late Gothic and decorated with the three groups of sculptures: the legend of three marriages of Saint Anne, statues of the Apostles, and a statue of Mary on the top.

==== Altar of Anthony of Padua ====
This altarpiece is composed of the two late-Gothic altarpieces from the first half of the 16th century, which were saved after a great fire of the city of Košice in 1556.

The paintings on its wings are the oldest dated of all altarpiece paintings in the cathedral. They depict 16 saints on both sides. In 1860, the altar image of Anthony of Padua, painted by Ferenc Klimkovics, was placed in the original arch.

==== Altar of Mettercia ====
This neo-Gothic altarpiece dates from the end of the 19th century. It was manufactured by order of Bishop Zsigmond Bubics to house the newly found late-Gothic painting of Mettercia, a rare painting of Tyrolean origin from 1516 that depicts Saint Anne and the ancestry of Isaiah.

The painting was made for a commission from the family of pharmacist Bartolomej Czottman. Both he and his wife are depicted with their coats of arms, among which the coat of arms of Košice is placed in accordance with the latest grant of arms. A mortar, as a symbol of pharmacists, is featured beyond the municipal coat of arms.

==== Altar of Saint Anne ====
One of the series of neo-Gothic altarpieces from 1896 bought for the cathedral on the occasion of the millennial celebration of the Hungarians' arrival to the homeland, as well as of the termination of restoration works. The altarpiece was a gift from incumbent Bishop Zsigmond Bubics.

==== Altar of Wise Men ====
Bought in Paris, it was a gift from Bishop Zsigmond Bubics in 1896.

==== Altar of Saint Joseph ====
A gift from Konstantin Schuster, the bishop of Vác, in 1896. It was crafted of pieces bought in Brussels by Lajos Lantay, a sculptor from Pöstyén.

==== Altar of Saint Stephen ====
A gift from František Pogač, the canon of Košice, in 1896. Crafted by Ferdinand Stufflesser, the Tyrolean carver.

==== Altar of the Three Martyrs of Košice ====
The Three Martyrs of Košice were beatified in 1905. Lajos Tihanyi crafted the altarpiece dedicated to them in 1923 in Banská Bystrica. Their remains are stored in the predella.

==== Altar of the Holy Cross ====
The newest altarpiece in the cathedral, crafted in Košice in 1931 by Vojtech Buchner in commemoration of the victims of World War I. Two iron panels feature the names of all the people who contributed to the altarpiece's construction.

=== Altars no longer installed ===
==== Altar of the Last Supper ====
A triptych altarpiece from the last third of the 15th century. It is segmented in the deposit of the East Slovak Museum.

==== Altar of John the Baptist ====
A neo-Gothic altarpiece crafted for a rare oil tempera painted panel from 1516. It was in the cathedral until 1944. After reconstruction work from 1965 to 1970, the panel was obtained by the East Slovak Museum.

One side of the panel depicts the scene of the Baptism of Christ in Jordan, and the other depicts the torture of John the Baptist. They are of high quality with a notable influence of the Dutch and Flemish Renaissance.

==== Altar of the Death of Mary ====
An original Gothic altarpiece which was uninstalled in 1943. Only the predella was preserved, which is lost in the archival store of the cathedral.

=== Bronze baptistery ===
The Roman-Gothic baptistery from the 14th century is the oldest monument preserved in the cathedral. It comes from the old church of Saint Elizabeth, the ancestor of today's cathedral. The leg of the baptistery is decorated with triangles, and the chalice is ornamented with zoomorphic reliefs of lions, gryphons, and eagles. The upper brim is lined with an illegible Latin inscription. The lid dates back to 1914.

=== Wall frescoes ===
In 1892, during the large-scale reconstruction works, a number of original Gothic frescoes were discovered hidden under a layer of plaster since the period of Reformation. Three of them are in the south apse: The Savior on the Day of Judgement in an aureola (sitting Christ holding a sword, Mary and Saint Peter below him), Twelve Apostles, and The Resurrection of Christ (with his right hand holding a battalion and blessing with his left hand).

In the northern side apse, next to the entrance of the sacristy, is another set of genuine Gothic frescoes, including The Descent from the Cross, dating back to the 16th century and conceived as a winged wall altarpiece. In addition, the paintings on the right side are The Flagellation and The Coronation with Crown of Thorns, and on the left side are Christ Nailed at the Cross and Christ before Pilate.

=== Calvary ===
The sculpture of Calvary dating back to 1420 is one of the oldest articles of the Saint Elizabeth Cathedral's inventory. Its components are a 4.34-metre-tall cross with a 3.12-metre-tall nailed Christ in the centre, a 2.73-metre-tall statue of Mary on the right side, and 2.5-metre-tall statue of John the Evangelist on the left.

The group of statues was originally installed in a triumphal arch of the nave until 1936, when it was reinstalled in the Royal Oratory. This monumental artpiece of carved wood is notable for its deep theatricality of emotional expression.

=== Four wooden Gothic polychromed sculptures ===
These four wood carvings were crafted around 1470; authorship is attributed to Jan Weysz, a woodcarver from Prešov. The sculptures are 108–112 cm tall and share the period style of the Main Altarpiece of Saint Elizabeth.

Their current installation—in the choir's pillars of the western portal—is secondary. Originally, they probably formed a component of an unpreserved upper part of St. Elizabeth's altarpiece. The sculptures represent Saint Stephen, his son Saint Emeric of Hungary, Saint Ladislaus, and Stanislaus of Szczepanów.

=== Mater Dolorosa on column ===
A 112-cm-tall polychromed wood carving from the period of 1500. It is installed on a late Gothic twisted column. Above the statue, a Gothic ciborium was inserted into the southern side wall. The expressiveness and the pleating of the gown attest to the high level of late Gothic wood-carving in Košice.

=== Lantern of Matthias Corvinus ===
This pinnacle with a niche for a lantern is built on a twisted stone column and dates back to the end of the 15th century. The pinnacles' tympanums are ornamented with the coat of arms of Košice, the Kingdom of Hungary, Czech, and Dalmatia.

Two coats of arms are present: one of the Hunyadi family, and one unidentified. Originally, the lamp illuminated the area in front of the southern portal towards the neighbouring cemetery. It served its purpose until the early 20th century, when it was adapted for gas lighting. It was installed in its current place on the wall of Matthias Tower in 1940.

=== Choir ===
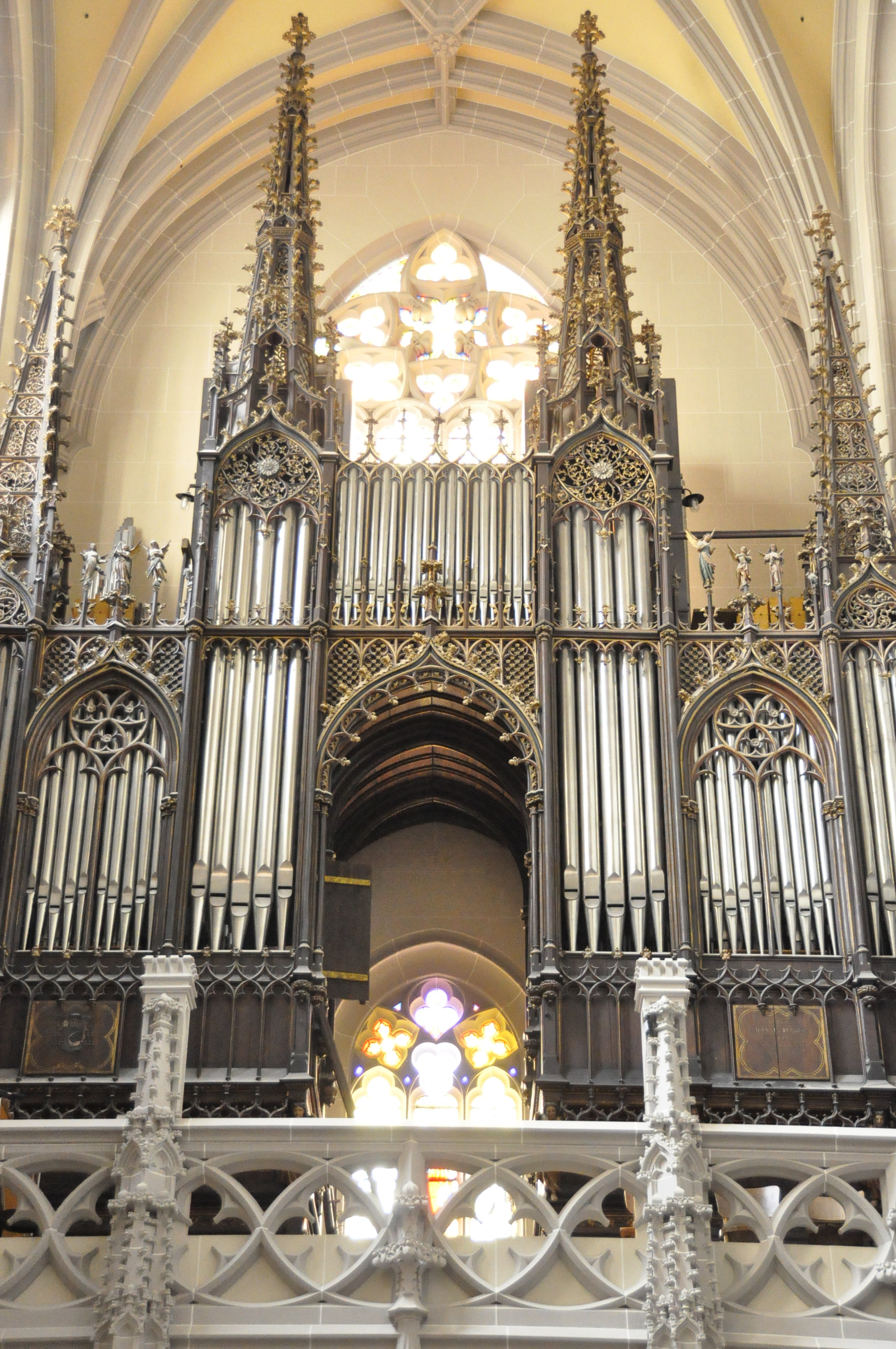
Pipe organ choir

The pipe organ choir was completely replaced during the period of large-scale reconstruction works at the end of the 19th century. The current replica is a bit longer and has more pillars than the original one. The four polychromed sculptures by Jan Weysz (described above) are installed on the pillars and complemented with another four neo-Gothic sculptures of kings of Hungary: Charles I of Hungary, Louis I of Hungary, Sigismund of Luxemburg, and Matthias Corvinus.

A new pipe organ was crafted by Angster from Patkostolie. It is accessed through a stairway in the southern tower. The original one was discovered in Košice by a collector, Austrian Count Johann Nepomuk Wilczek, who bought it and had it transported to his castle Burg Kreuzenstein near Vienna.

=== Pastophorium ===
A stone pastophorium for storing the eucharist, located in the northern pillar of the triumphal arch, is the most accurate stone masonry work in the cathedral. It was crafted by Master Štefan around 1477. The pastophorium has a hexagonal plan and is ornated with complex composition of pillars moldings, friezes, arcades, and arches.

The twisted niche for storing the eucharist is located on the first floor pastophorium. The metal-tipped door, decorated with thumbnails of coat of arms, dates back to the 15th century. A tiny plaster sculptures of prophets and kneeling angels replaced former missing parts at the end of the 19th century. After the Council of Trent, the pastophorium became redundant, and thus the staircase leading to the pastophorium lost its purpose and was removed in 1860.

=== Relief of Saint Elizabeth ===
This relief originated in the same period as the stone pastophorium and the authorship is also attributed to Master Štefan. It is made of three parts that do not fit together because of their compositions. The relief by itself is decorated in an abrupt manner in contrast with the hexagonal ciborium containing filigree scenes from the Old Testament.

The ciborium (in the shape of the pinnacle) is tipped with a sculpture of a nestled pelican, which is the symbol of Christ's blood. In the 19th century, the relief was complemented with the Latin inscription "S.Elisabeth ora pro nobis" positioned above the console.

=== Rainer Melichar epitaph ===
The Baroque epitaph of the family of Rainer Melichar—the municipal reeve (mayor)—is one of the few neo-Gothic relics preserved in the cathedral and dates back to the beginning of the 17th century. Between the two family coats of arms lies an image of Flagellation; above, there is a sculpture of Christ crucified. Above the tympanum there is a group of Baroque sculptures: two angels on the sides and Christ holding the Earth in the middle.

=== Aureole of Madonna ===
Another Baroque relic in the cathedral which appropriately amplifies the aesthetic interior décor is a hanging aureole from the first half of the 18th century, installed under the triumphal arch. A double-sided sculpture of Madonna with Child is in the middle of the aureole.

=== Pews ===
Some of the cathedral pews are from the 18th century and crafted in Baroque style; others are from the end of the 19th century. The oppositely positioned canonical pews in the presbytery were crafted during the period of large-scale reconstruction works of the cathedral (mid-1800s) in accordance with the design of the main architect, Imre Steindl. He designed the patronal pew of commons with an engraved painted coat of arms of Košice.

=== Annunciation to the Blessed Virgin Mary (Chapel of Mettercia) ===
One of the two chapels in the cathedral is the Chapel of Annunciation to the blessed Virgin Mary, located in the area between the Matthias Tower and the vestibule of the southern portal. It was built in 1477 by Štefan, and allegedly his portrait is on the console of cross-ribbed vaults. The builder holds a paper strip in his hands. The altarpiece of Mettercia is installed in the chapel, hence its alternate name. The parents of the Hungarian primate Juraj Szatmary had it built, hence the chapel is also called the Chapel of Szatmary.

In the beginning of the 19th century, a crypt of bishops of Košice was established under its floor. Their gravestones are embedded into the enclosure walls. Ignac Fabry, Zsigmond Bubics, Augustin Fischer-Colbrie, and Jozef Čársky are buried there.

=== Chapel of Saint Cross ===
The second chapel of the dome is the Chapel of Saint Cross, also built in the year 1475. Its donor was the city consul and reeve Augustín Cromer, thus it is also called Cromer's Chapel. Nowadays, it is used as the sacristy.

=== King's Oratory (empora) ===
The King's Oratory was built roughly alongside the old cathedral. It was created on the first floor of the polygonal arch of the south annex of the transept aisle. On the wall under the oratory is a significant epigraphic monument dating from 1441, when John Jiskra of Brandýs was the captain of Košice. The epigraph declares the loyalty of the people of Košice to King Ladislav Pohrobek.

=== Twisted staircase ===
The twisted staircase is from the 15th century and leads to the king's empora (balcony). The staircase divides into two arms; the west arm heads to the attic of cathedral.

It is constrained and therefore it is assumed to have had a mainly decorative function. This twisted staircase is the oldest existing one in Europe. In 1499–1500, a similar staircase (Doppelwendeltreppe Graz) was built in the imperial residence in Graz, Austria, modeled after this Košice staircase.

=== Singer stage ===
The stone gallery located on the north wall of the main aisle (in place of a presbytery) belongs to the original accommodation of the cathedral. Its purpose was likely for actors and singers to present medieval allegories and mysteries during the worship ceremony.

=== Statue of Saint Florian ===
Saint Florian was the patron of firemen and granted protection from fire. The town built his statue in 1748, which first stood near St Michael's Church (later Chapel), and later, near the south wall of St Urban Tower. In 1940, it was moved to where it now stands at the entrance hall of the cathedral's south portal.

=== Adyton ===
Construction of the adyton occurred during the third part of construction of the dome, in 1440–1462. In addition, the consoles have neo-Gothic statues representing saints by Jana Marschalek from the end of 19th century.

The windowpanes were created by Karl Geyling in Vienna in 1860. On the panes are illustrated coats of arms of minor canons.

=== Sacrificial altar ===
The newest element of the cathedral's inventory is the sacrificial altar of the celebrating priest. It is located in front of the main altar, and is carved from a single piece of sandstone in the shape of two arms creating an ellipse.

The sacrificial altar stands on the tabernacle in the shape of a heart. Near the altar is a new ambon (place for preaching) and the sedeses (chairs). All three objects were created by Michael and Thomas Baník in 1994.

=== Pulpit ===
The stone pulpit with wooden shelter is the masterpiece of sculptors W. Aubram and R. Argenti. On the twisted staircase leading to it are placed statues of the argurs and the church fathers.

=== Crypt of Rákóczi ===
Beside the north wall of the dome, a crypt was built in 1906 for the remains of Francis II Rákoczi—Hungarian nobleman and Prince of Transylvania—and his family and favored friends. The crypt and the four stone sarcophagi were designed by professor Frigyes Schulek from Budapest.

In one sarcophagus are buried together the prince, his mother (Ilona Zrínyi), and his older son Joseph. The southern sarcophagus is of General Count Antal Esterházy, while the northern one is where Miklós Sibrik is interred. The fourth sarcophagus, on the other side of crypt, contains the remains of Count Miklós Bercsényi and his second wife, Krisztina Csáky.

=== Apotheosis of life Ferenc II Rákóczi ===
This monumental mural painting above the north portal of the cathedral is from years 1914–16 and its author is Andor Dudics (or Dudits). It is a triptych.

== Exterior ==
=== North portal ===
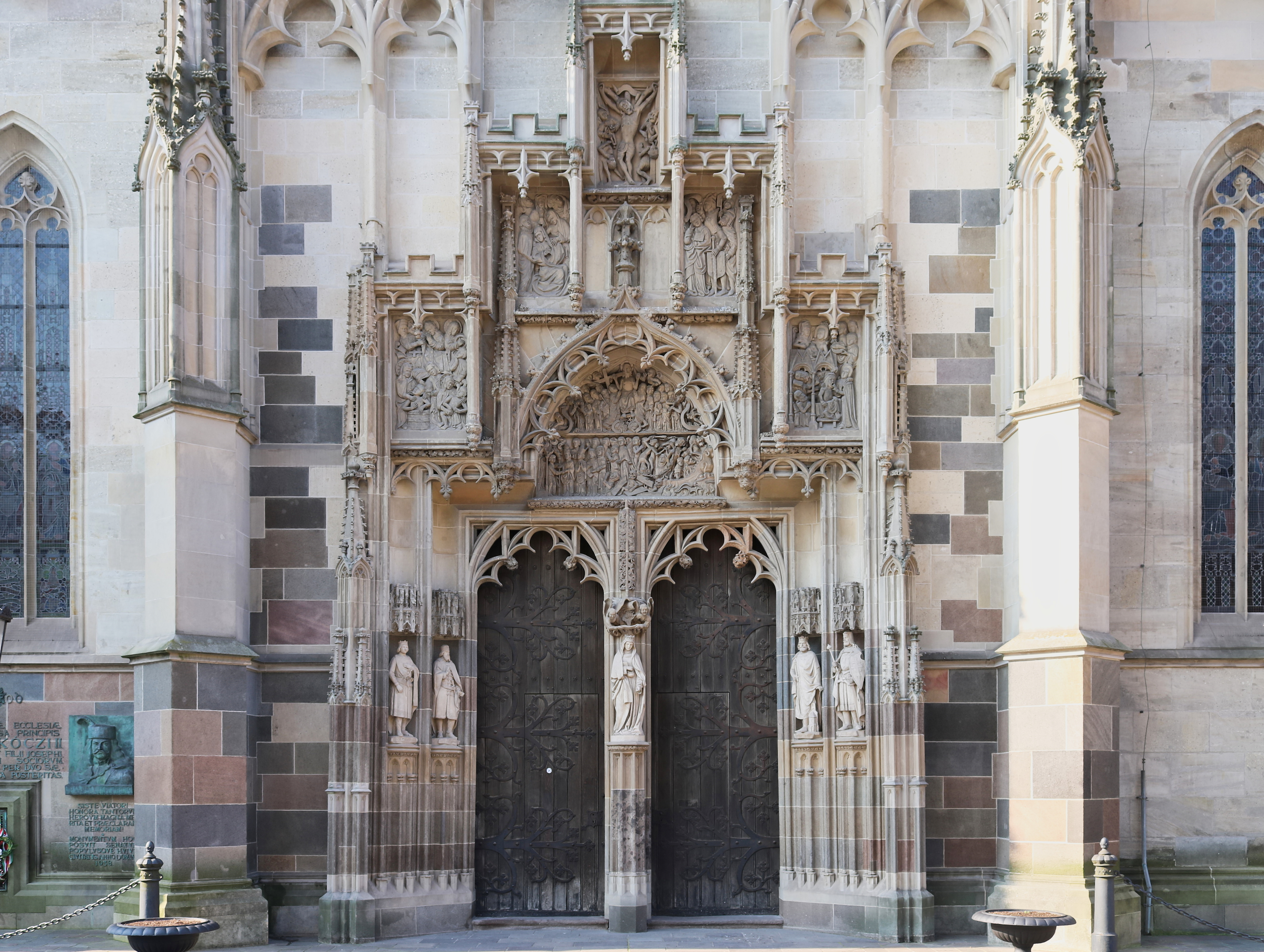
North portal

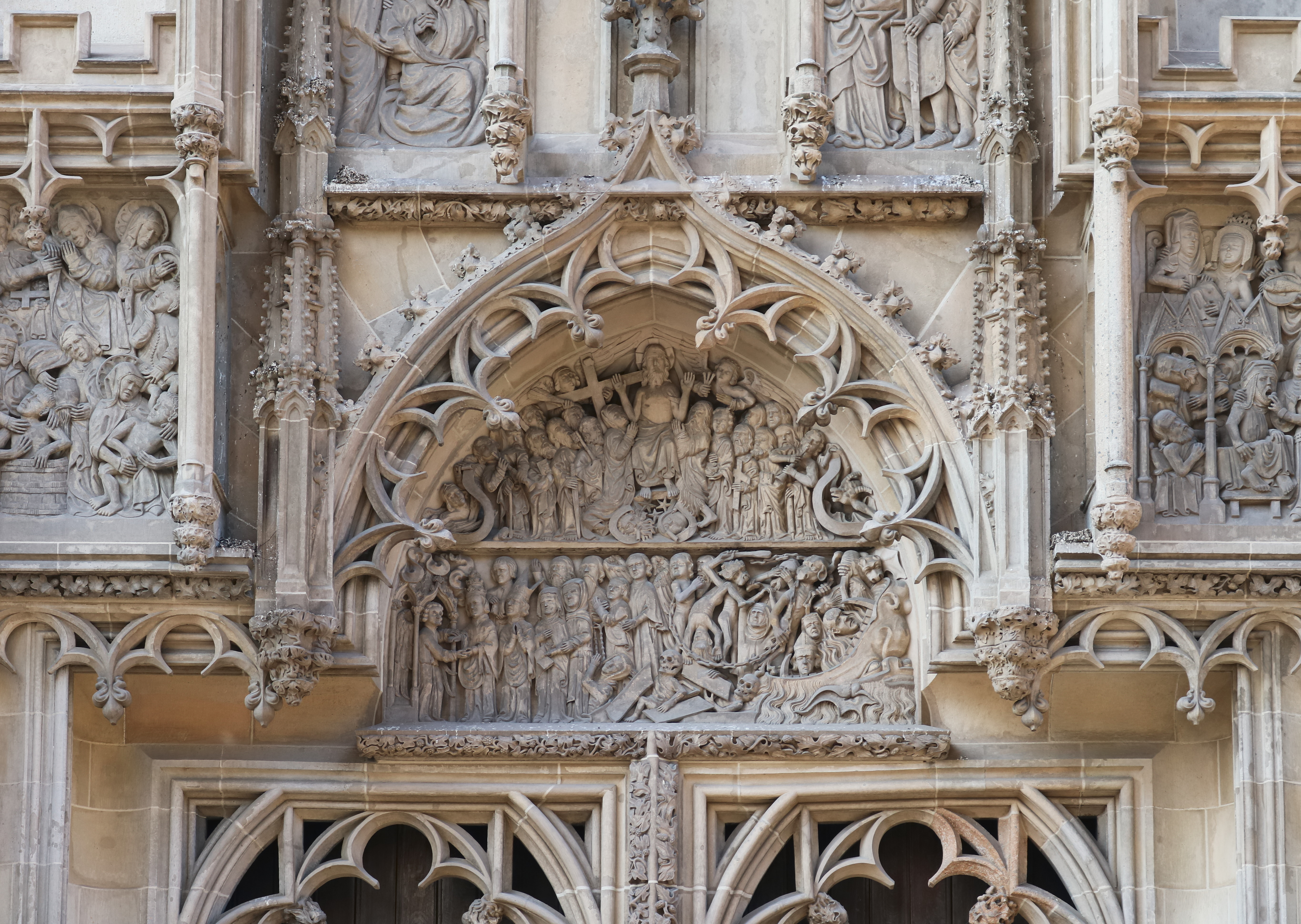
Relief at top of north portal

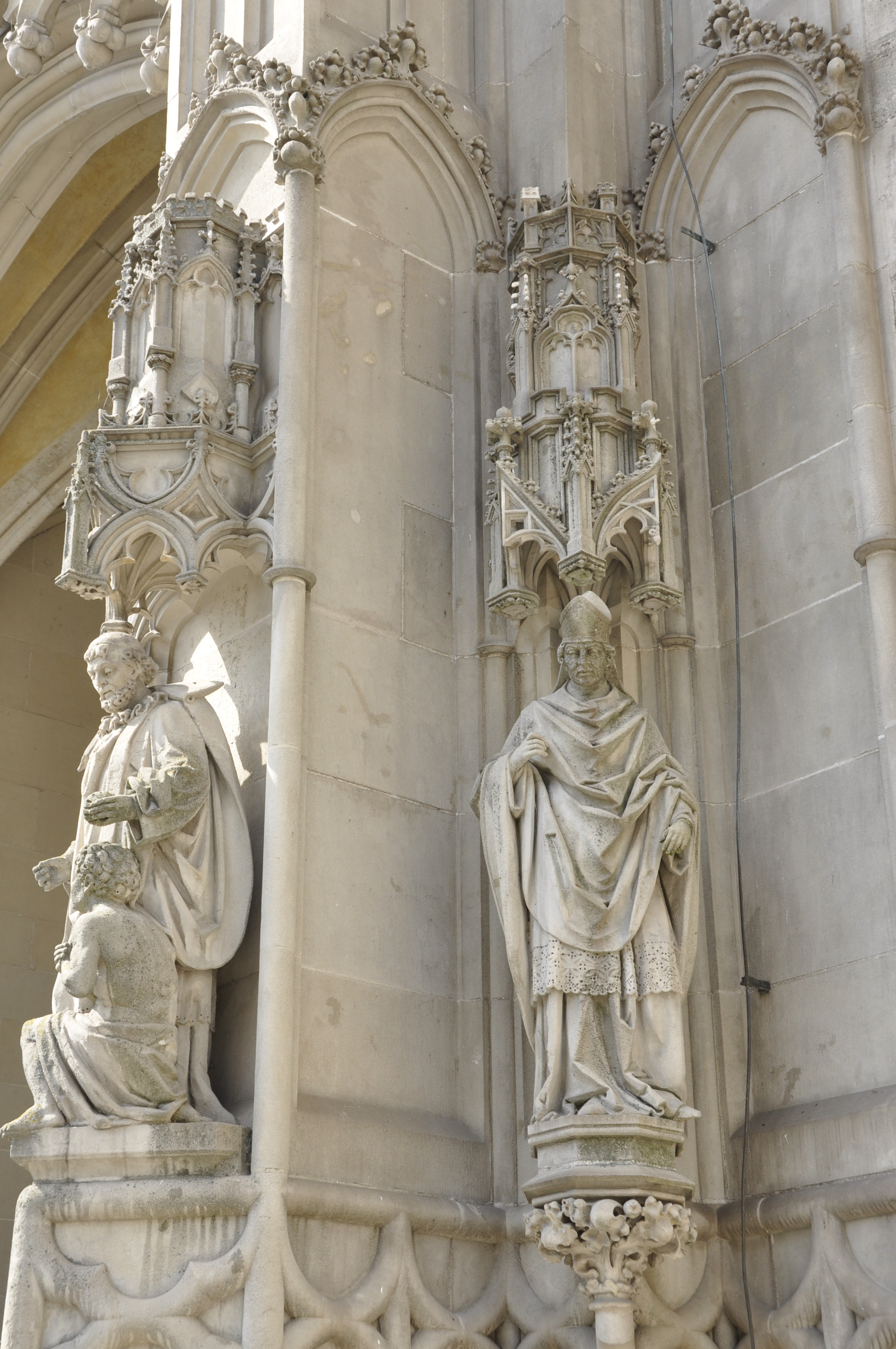
Statues of the north portal

The design of the north portal is rare within medieval tradition, in which the north sides of churches did not have portals. Its statues are the most decorative out of the three portals of the cathedral, probably because it faced the busiest part of medieval Košice – to the city market and the city hall. The portal is known as the Golden Gate, because it was gilded in the Middle Ages.

The north portal has two entrance doors. Above those is an arch with a relief of the Last Judgement. The relief is divided into two parts. In the lower one, a crowd of people is seen heading to the gates of heaven, where they are welcomed by an angel, while those going to hell are enchained and heading to Leviathan's jaws with devils. The upper part shows the Last Judgement, with two angels with horns announcing the end of the world. The other figures represent the Twelve Apostles.

Above the relief are placed five frame reliefs decorated by pinnacles and profiled and traceried motives. Two lower framed reliefs refer to the life of St Elizabeth. The other three recreate the scene from Calvary.

At the top is Christ crucified on the cross in the shape of a tree of life. The other two crucified on Golgotha are shown: on the left side, the saved soul is carried to heaven by an angel, while on the right side, the soul is carried to hell by a devil. Under the scene of the Crucifixion are crying women around Virgin Mary under the cross (left side) and John the Evangelist surrounded by Roman soldiers (right side).

During the great reconstruction of the dome, niches were added along both gates of north portal to house neo-Gothic statues of the saints. The niches are original, and it is not known what statues stood in them during previous centuries.

Other neo-Gothic statues decorate the portal of the east gavel. The statues are of Hungarian kings, including Charles I of Hungary, his wife Elizabeth of Poland, and Louis of Hungary. They are masterpieces of the Budapest sculptor Lajos Lantay.

=== West portal ===
According to liturgical custom, the main entrance to the church is the west portal. Although it has three gates, this entrance has the simplest stone decoration. Two sides are without figure decoration. Above the main gate are two reliefs—one of them directly over the gate shows Christ in Getsemane garden piteously praying to His Father.

To the left of Christ are the apostles Peter, John, and Jacob, while from the right come soldiers led by Judas. In the seddle finish of the portal is the scene of Pieta, Virgin Mary holding Christ body, surrounded by Maria Magdalene and Mary Joseph. The uppermost relief shows angels holding Veronica's towel with Christ's face print.

The whole symbology of portals relates with local tradition of The Holy Blood. At the end of 19th century, two neo-Gothic statues were placed to the main gate, of which only one—the statue of John the Baptist—has been preserved.

=== South portal ===
The south portal differs from the previous two portals by the fact that it is placed to the anteroom under the king's empora. It has two gates, the same as the north portal, but without the figures in relief. Instead, they are finished by saddles with triangle circling pikes above which is another row of saddles. The portal gives the impression of a triple level entrance to the cathedral.

An interesting component of the portal is aerial bolt of gothic arch of an anteroom with leaf ornaments. The baldachin of the statue in the middle of the portal is formed by flying rooks; another rook and a beast hold devices of the torment. Based on this it, is supposed that under the baldachin was previously a statue of Christ.

Today, there is statue of Imaculata from the end of the 19th century made by statue maker János Marschalkó. The other statues at the portal are saints, emperor Constantine the Great, Elizabeth of Hungary, Adalbert of Prague, Andrew the Apostle (patron of Košice archdiocese), Francis Xavier, and Bishop Teodor. These statues have nothing to do with the symbolism of the portal; they represent patrons and those who financed the major reconstruction of the cathedral at the end of the 19th century. The middle portrait belongs to architect Imre Steindl. The others included Fridrich Wilhelm Fröde and Otto Sztehló.

=== Sigismund's Tower ===
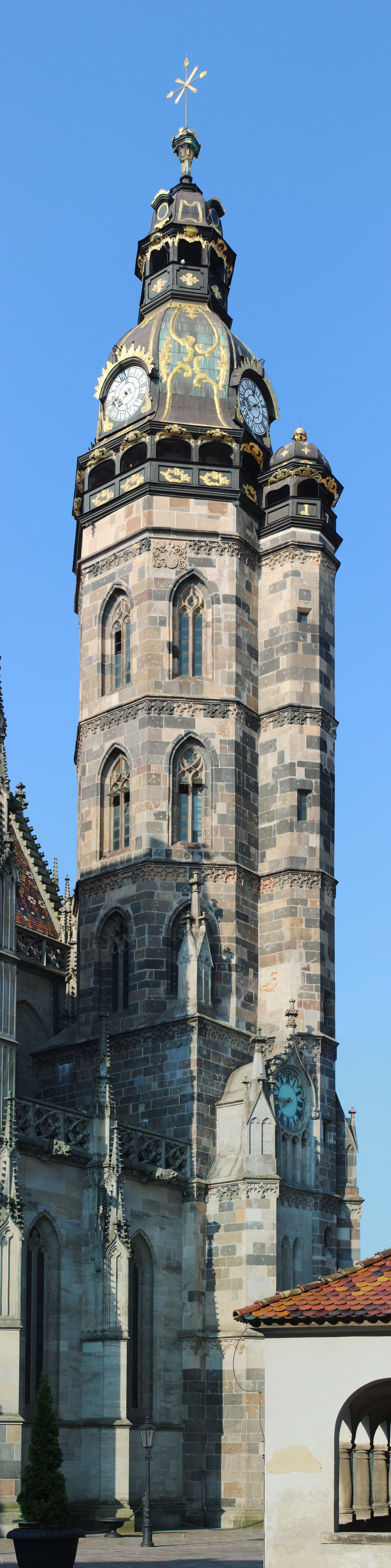
Sigismund's Tower

The north tower, which was built in the second period of church construction in 1420–40, was finished in the third period of construction in 1462. This is proved by the Košice coat of arms sculpted with the year "1462" over the portal of the west façade, which is also the entrance to the tower.

The tower has a square floor plan for three levels; from the fourth level, it narrows to an octagonal floor plan. A simply decorated tower, it has between-floor cordons decorated by cresting with a geometric motif. Between the fourth and fifth floors is a frieze of rosettes, each with a different design.

Sigimund's Tower was heavily damaged between 1490 and 1491 when Košice was besieged by John I Albert's army. It was reconstructed by Nicolaus Crompholz from Niš, under the guidance of Vaclav from Prague in 1494–97.

After the fire in 1775, the tower was built up a little bit and on the top of it a Rococo monkshood was mounted, which created the sixth floor of the tower. The monkshood is covered by a copper sheet with gold-coated plumber components. It is topped by a copper cross 3 meters tall.

The tower has 160 steps and is 59.7 metres (196 ft) tall. On the first floor there is a large clock mechanism, and on the second floor there is construction for the bells. On the third floor are two bells from 1926. Alexander Buchner had new bells cast – one of which weighs 530 kg and holds names of those killed during World War I. There is also a fire brigade room, which was used until the 1970s.

=== Matthias Tower ===
The south tower was built in the second period of cathedral construction from 1420 to 1440. After a construction break, construction of the tower followed in 1462, when the north tower was finished. The works were managed by Master Štefan until 1477.

The tower had a square floor plan. It is constructed in a more decorated and massive way in comparison with the north tower, although it was not built up to its planned height. It is finished to the level of the crown cordon of the main aisle with decorative wreathes, which contain heraldries of countries belonging to King Matthias and heraldry of Košice.

The tower is now covered by an octagon metal-sheet roof. A curiosity of the tower is its labyrinth of interlinked circular staircases, the significance of which is not understood. The entrance is from the west choir of the cathedral and its staircase also allows access to the pipe organ. The rich decoration of the exterior is complemented by the statues of Matthias Corvinus's supporters; these statues are by Budapest sculptor František Mikula and date from the 20th century.

=== Sun dial ===
On the exterior wall of the south façade, above the biggest window of the Mettercie Chapel, is situated the horologe-type sun dial, dating from the year 1477.

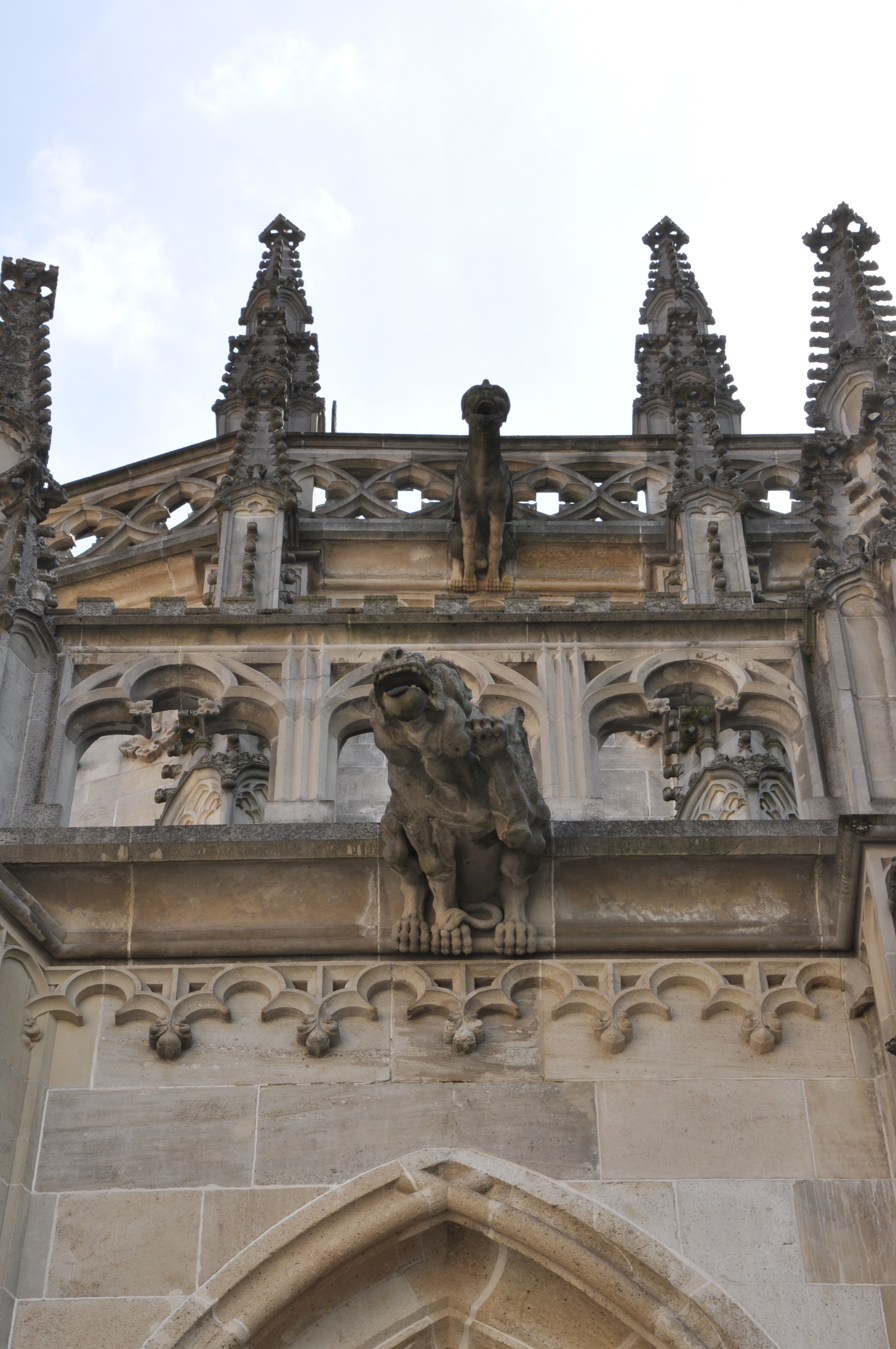
Exterior gargoyle and pinnacles

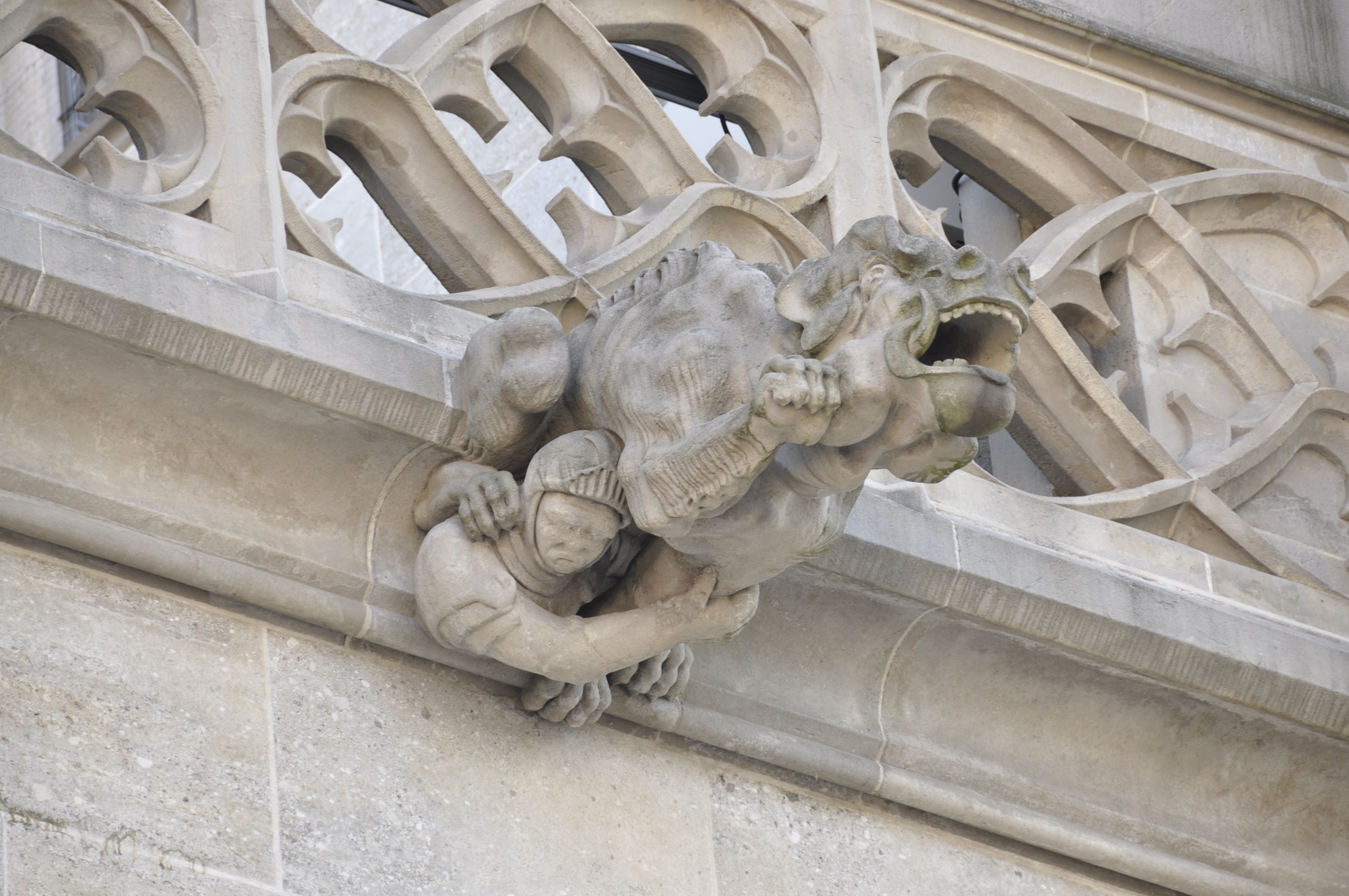
Gargoyle

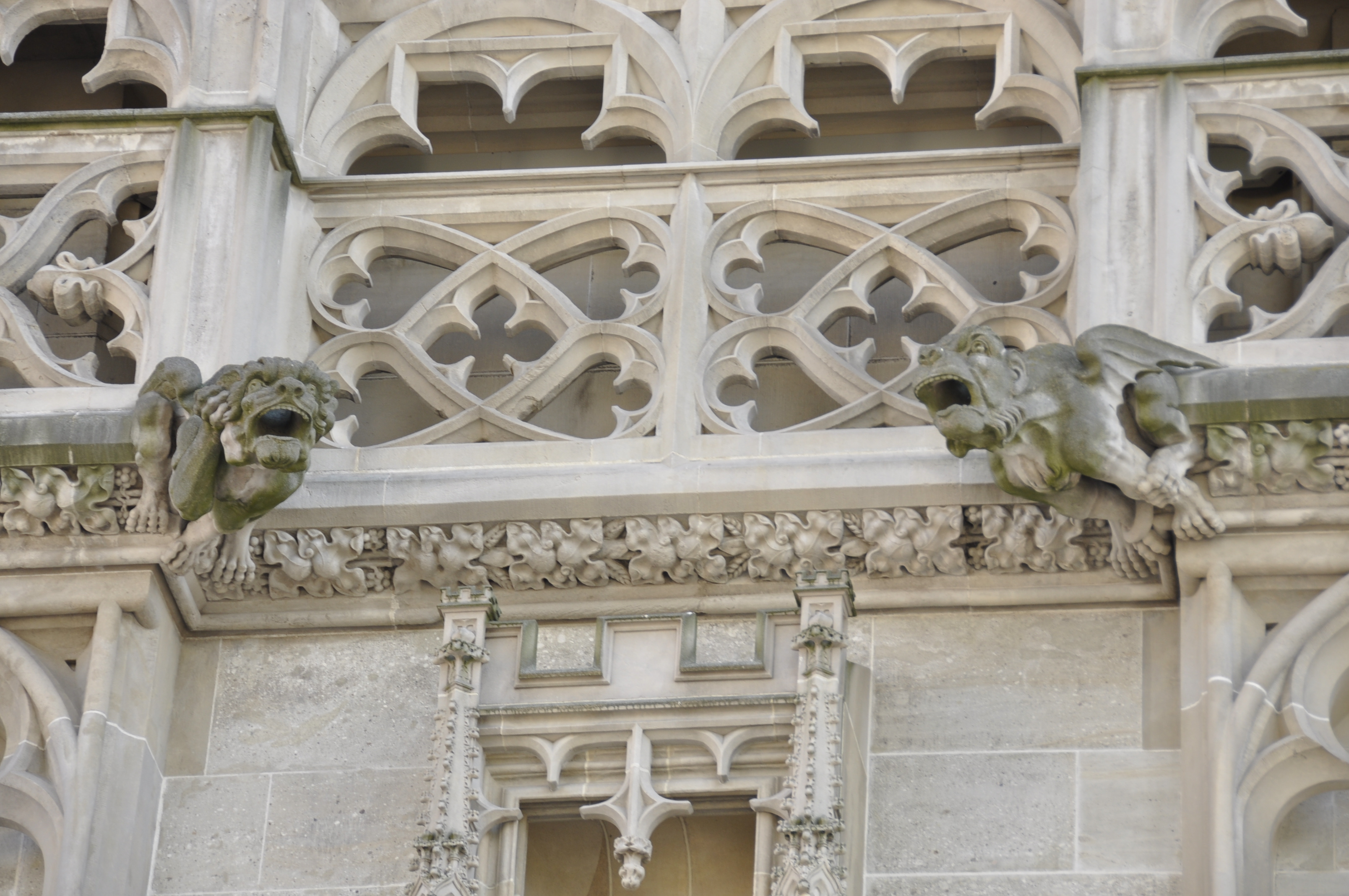
Gargoyles

=== Flèche ===
The neo-Gothic tower at the crosspoint of the main and transept aisles was created during the great reconstruction of the dome at the end of the 19th century. It has a wooden skeleton which is covered in copper.

=== Francis II Rakóczi memorial ===
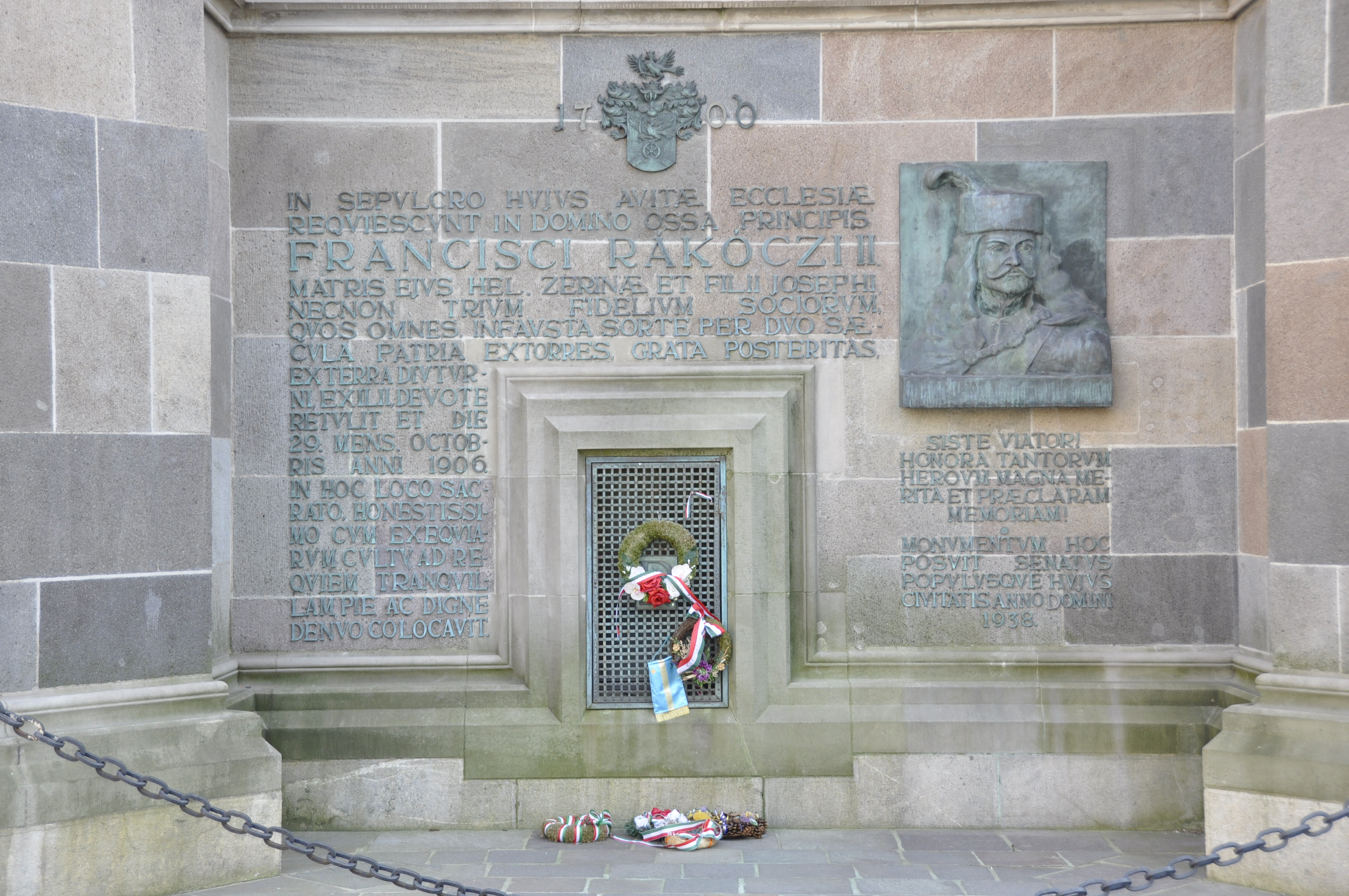
Exterior inscription

In 1906, the remains of Francis II Rákóczi and his group were carried from Turkey to Košice and entombed in the cathedral crypt.

On 24 July 1938, the memorial of the Kuruc Revolt was unveiled. The memorial was designed by Sipos and Vojtech Loffler. Vojtech Buchner moulded it with bronze.

== Monarch donations ==
In the Middle Ages and during modern times, Saint Elizabeth Cathedral was the largest church in the Kingdom of Hungary. Its construction was a very prestigious issue for the bourgeois, wealthy merchants, and craftsmen of Košice.

== Legends of the cathedral ==
Over the years, legends of the cathedral have emerged. Most of them have their roots in the Middle Ages during construction of the dome. Construction continuing over the centuries gave birth to the legend of the "hollow stone", which the builders put in an unknown place in the cathedral. Were the stone to be lost, the whole cathedral would fall.

The gargoyle of the drunk woman is said in folklore to have been the master builder's alcoholic wife. Legend says that because she was tarnishing his reputation by her appearance in the town, he immortalised her as a gargoyle.

A legend about the lantern of King Matthias states that it has the power to remove the guilt of any criminal who stands under it.

The last legend is about Christ's Blood. During an ordinary Sunday Mass, the priest spilt the chalice of consecrated wine on the floor. The liquid formed an image of the suffering Christ, whom some believers claimed to have heard moan.

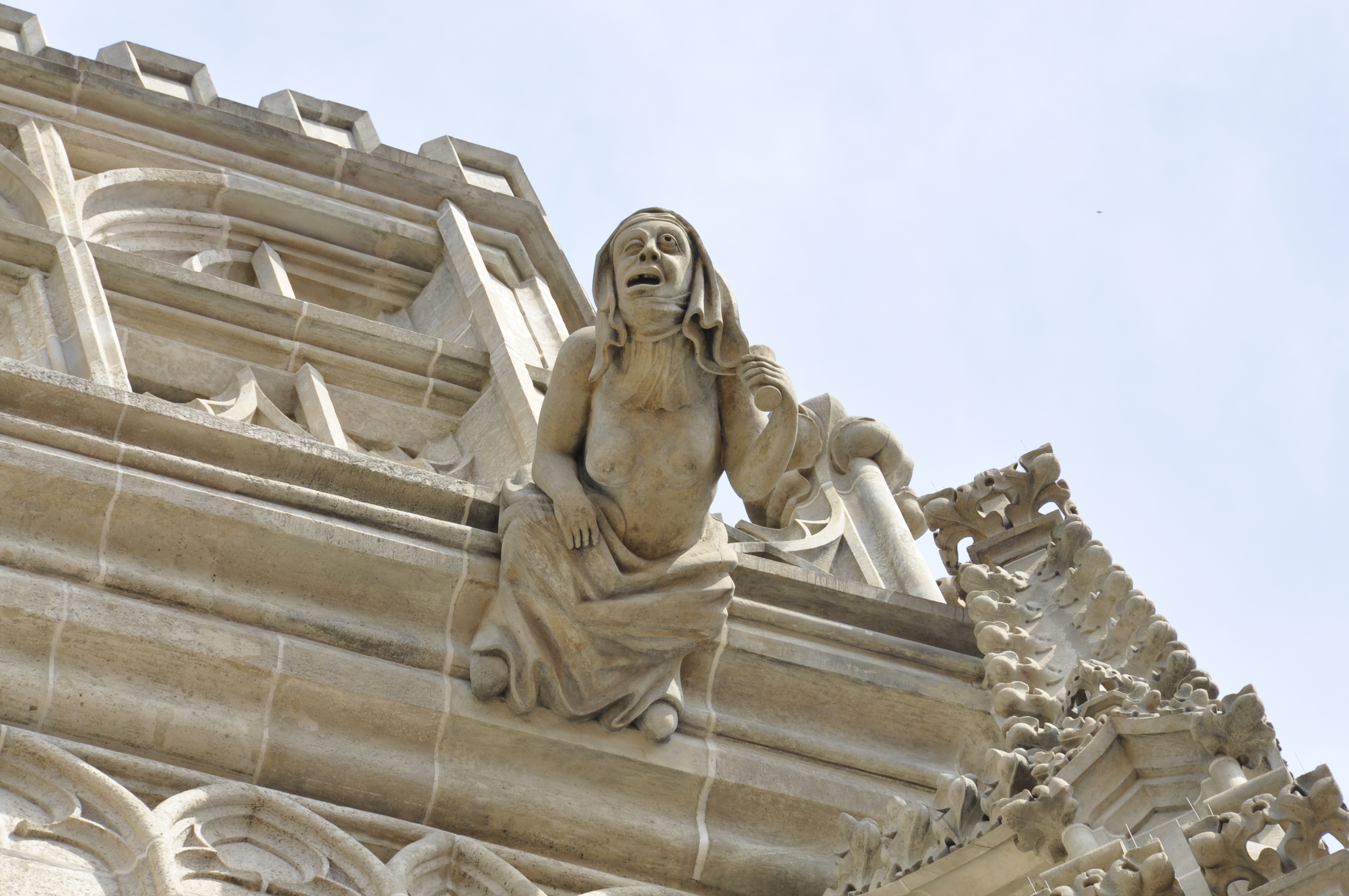
Gargoyle (drunk woman)

== Modern cultural usage ==
In October 2015, Hungarian rock band Omega, whose members declare Catholicism, performed their Biblically themed performance Oratórium ("Oratory") inside the cathedral. Since 2013, the show was exhibited in Hungary, Romania, and Germany, mostly in Calvinist Reformed churches, as well as Moscow's Cathedral of Christ the Saviour. The concert was sold-out and attended by 1,200 spectators, less than the potential capacity of 2,000. Following the concert and laypeople's criticisms of sacrilege, Archbishop Bober banned future rock concerts in the cathedral, allowing only religious, folk, or classical music.

In November 2025 the Portuguese priest and DJ Padre Guilherme played a live set outside the Cathedral of St. Elizabeth to mark the 75th birthday of Bernard Bober, Archbishop of Košice.

== Gallery ==
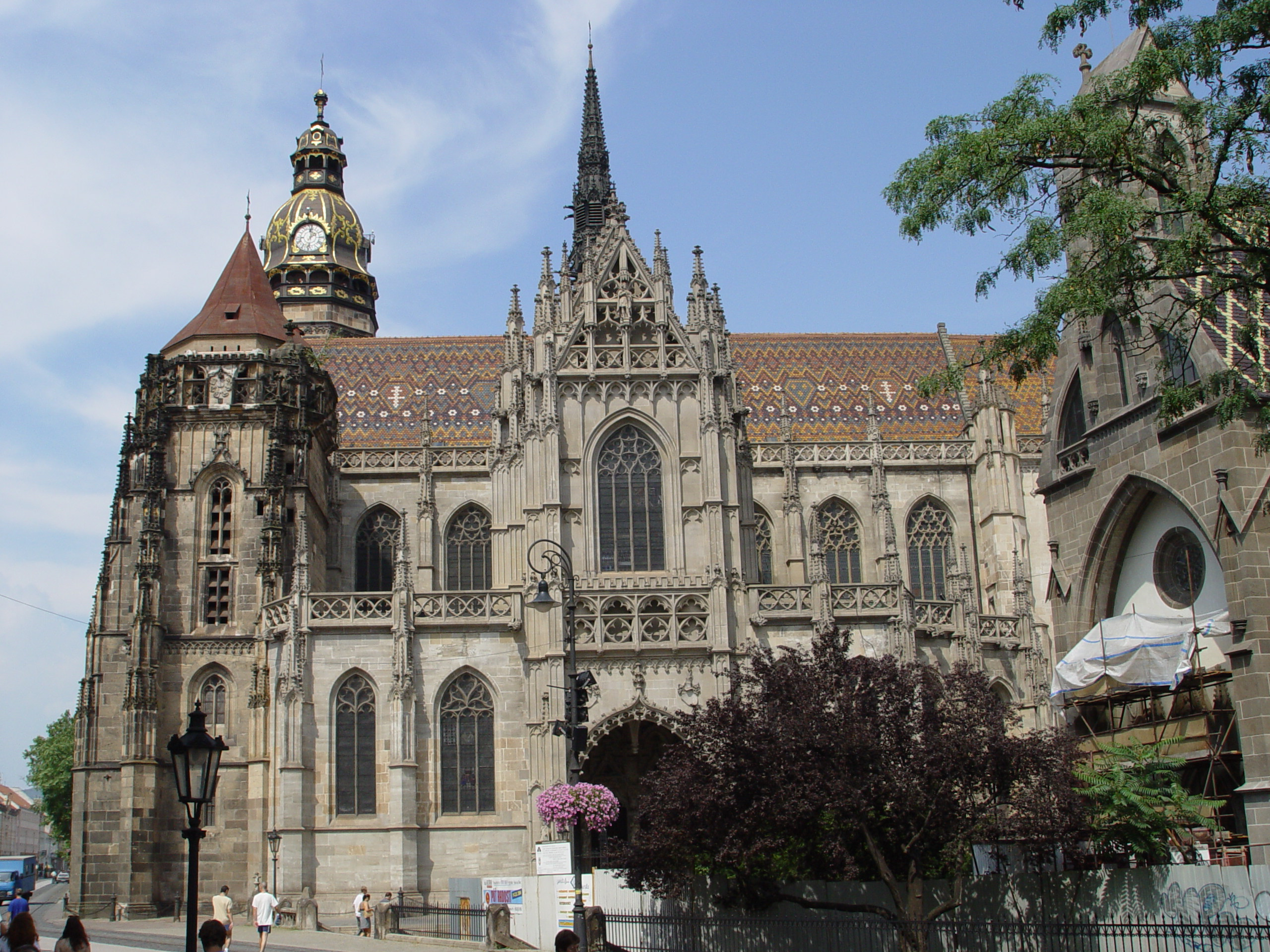
Cathedral viewed from the south

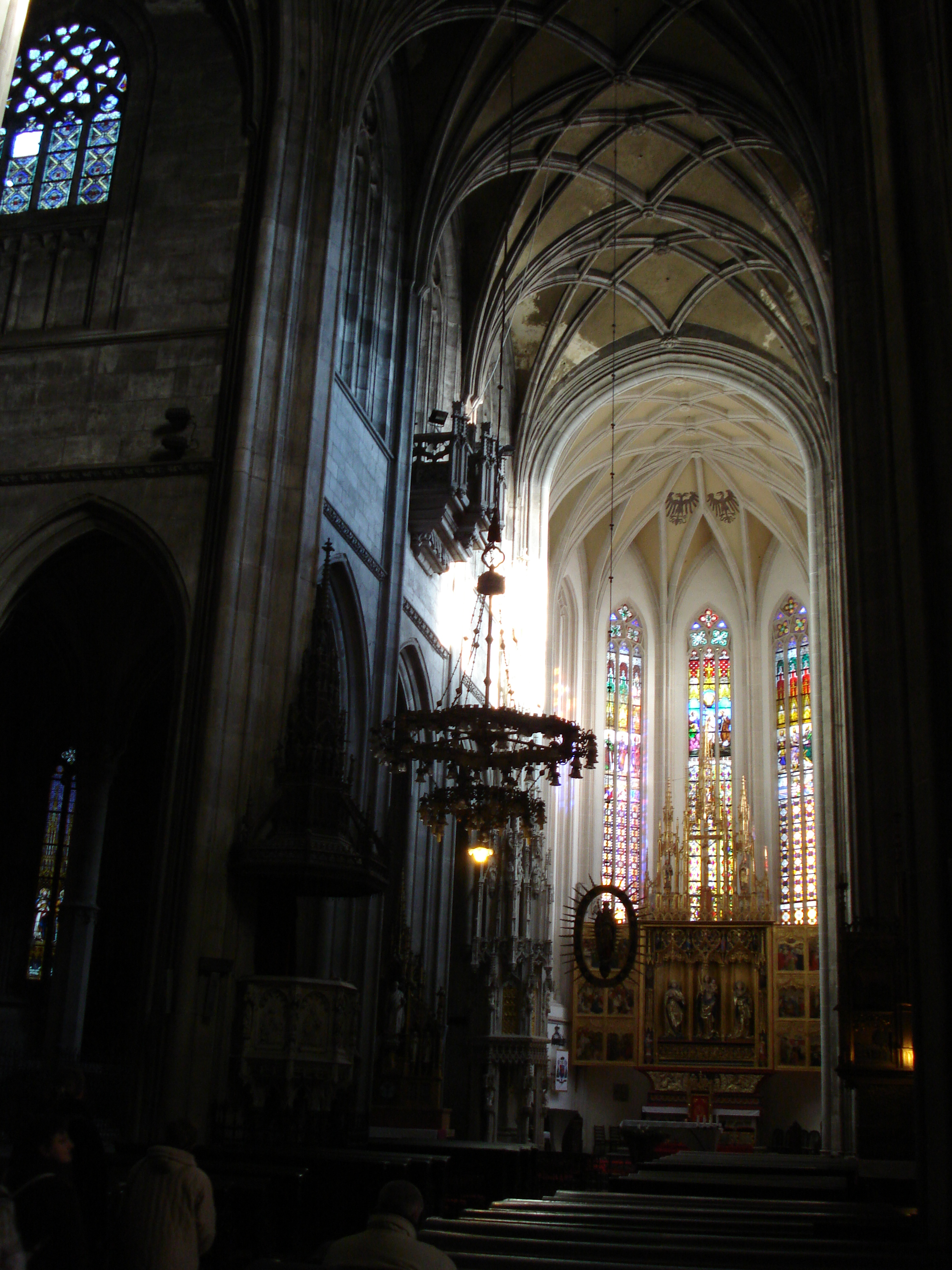
Cathedral choir

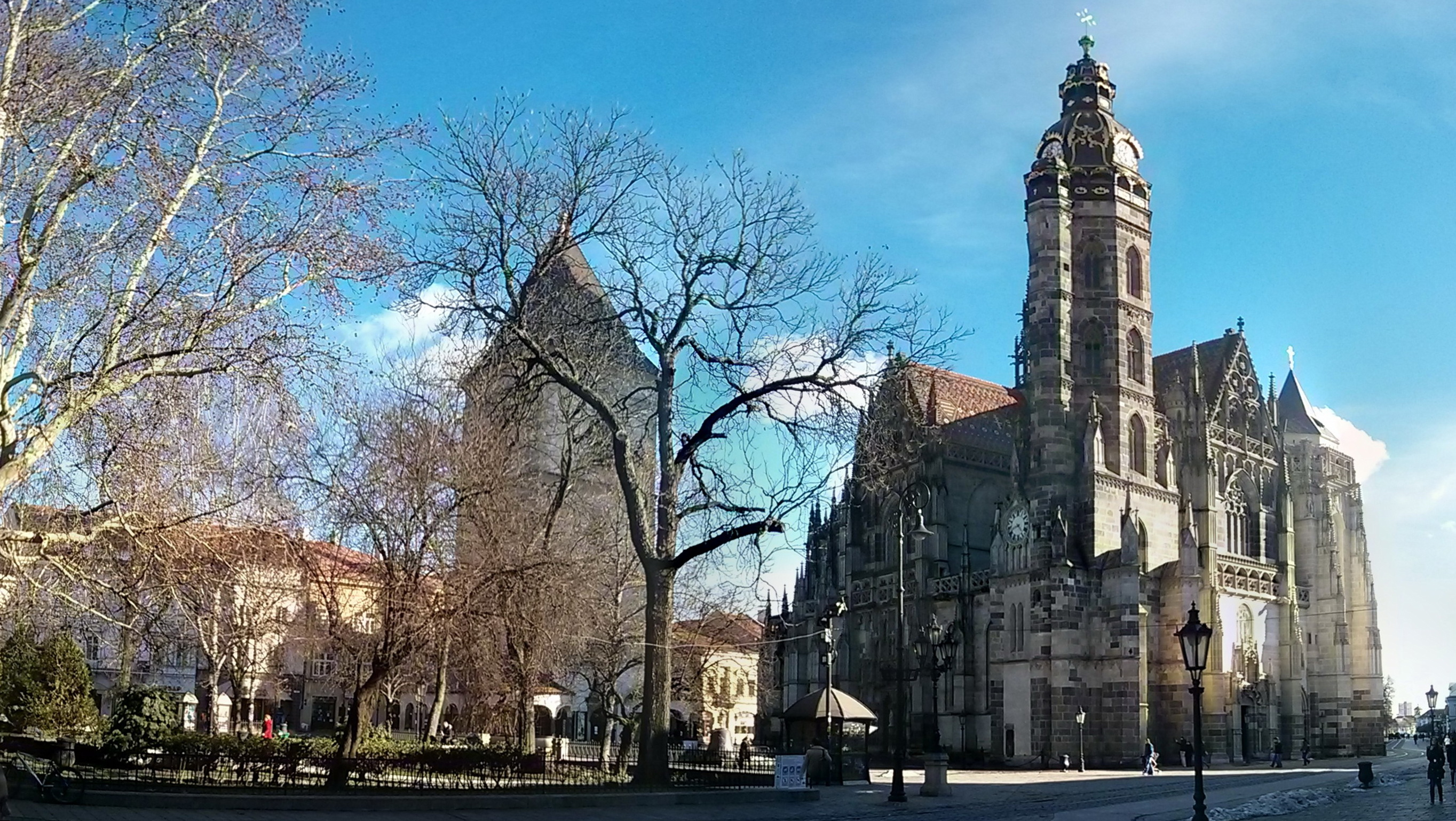
Cathedral of St. Elizabeth Košice (right) and St Urban Tower (left)

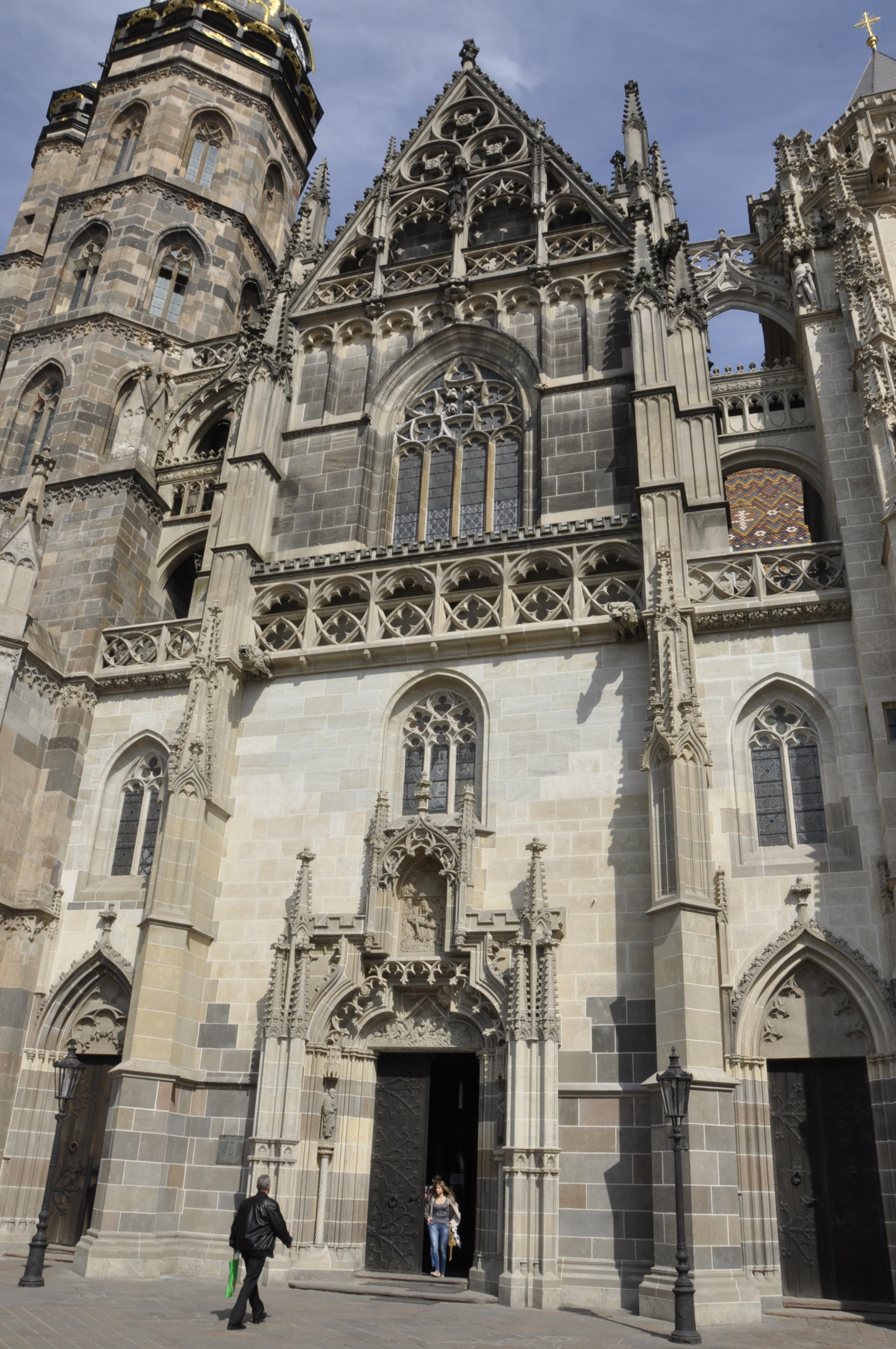
West portal

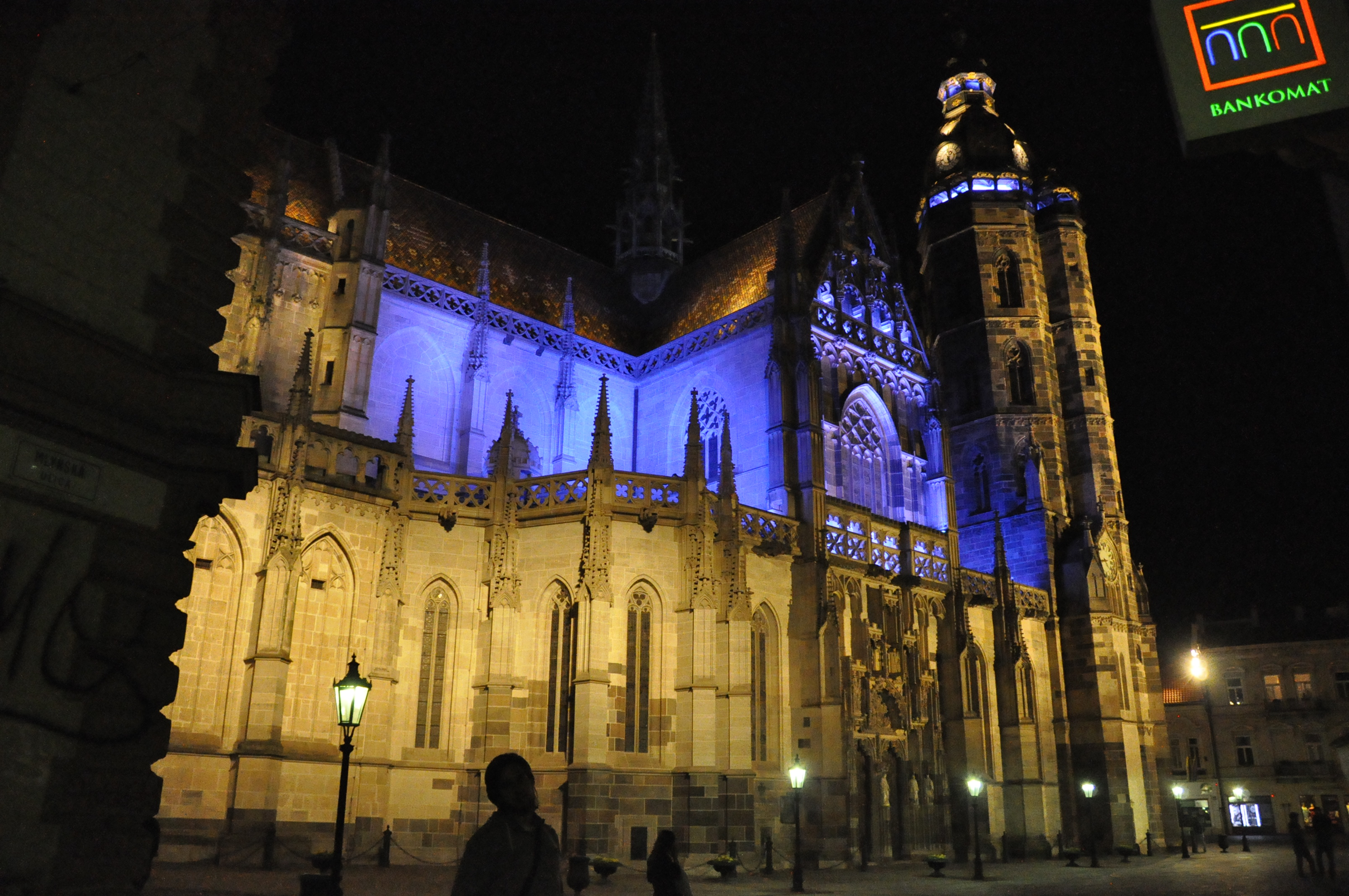
Night view from Mlynská Street

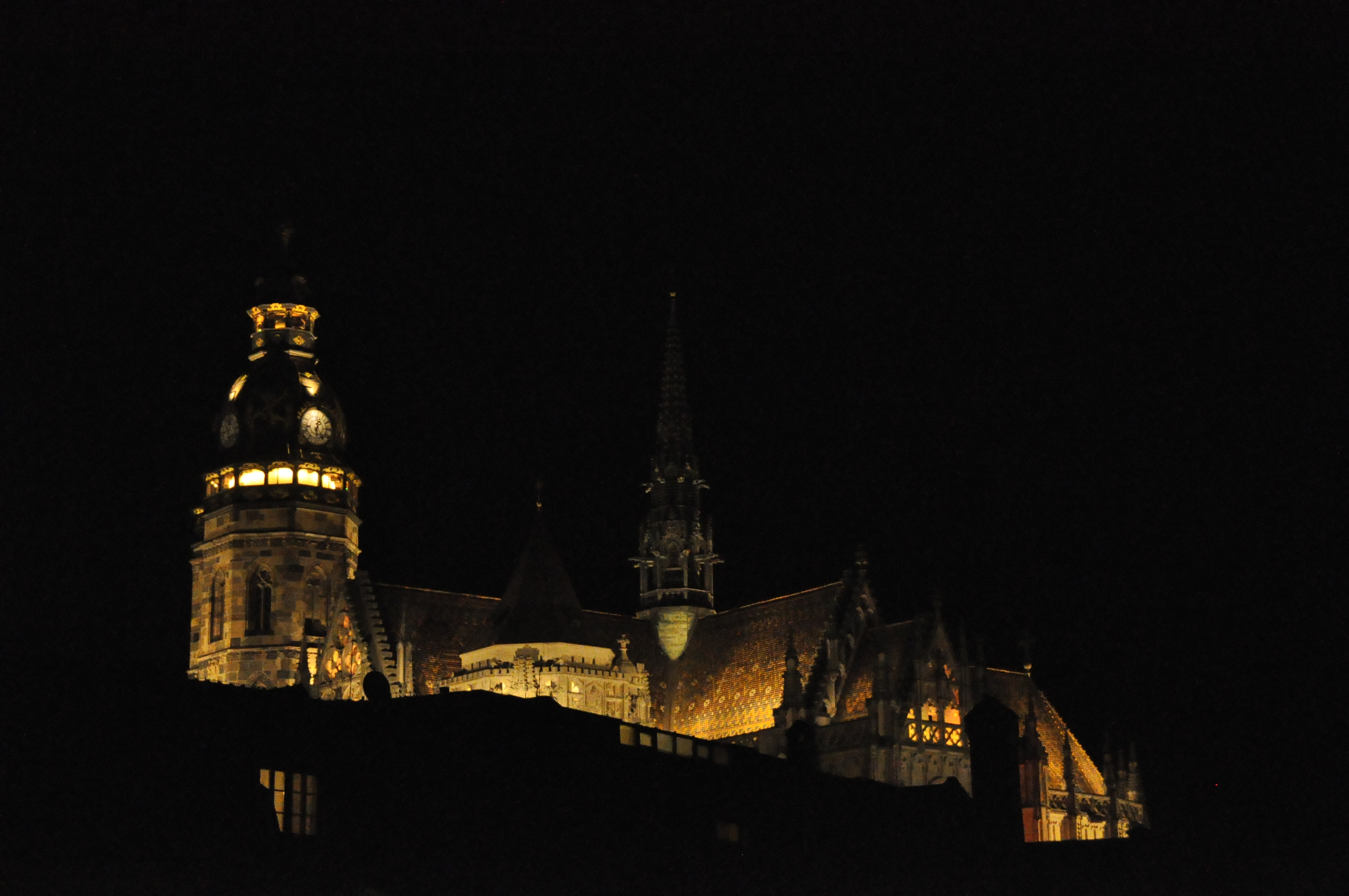
Night view from Vrátna Street

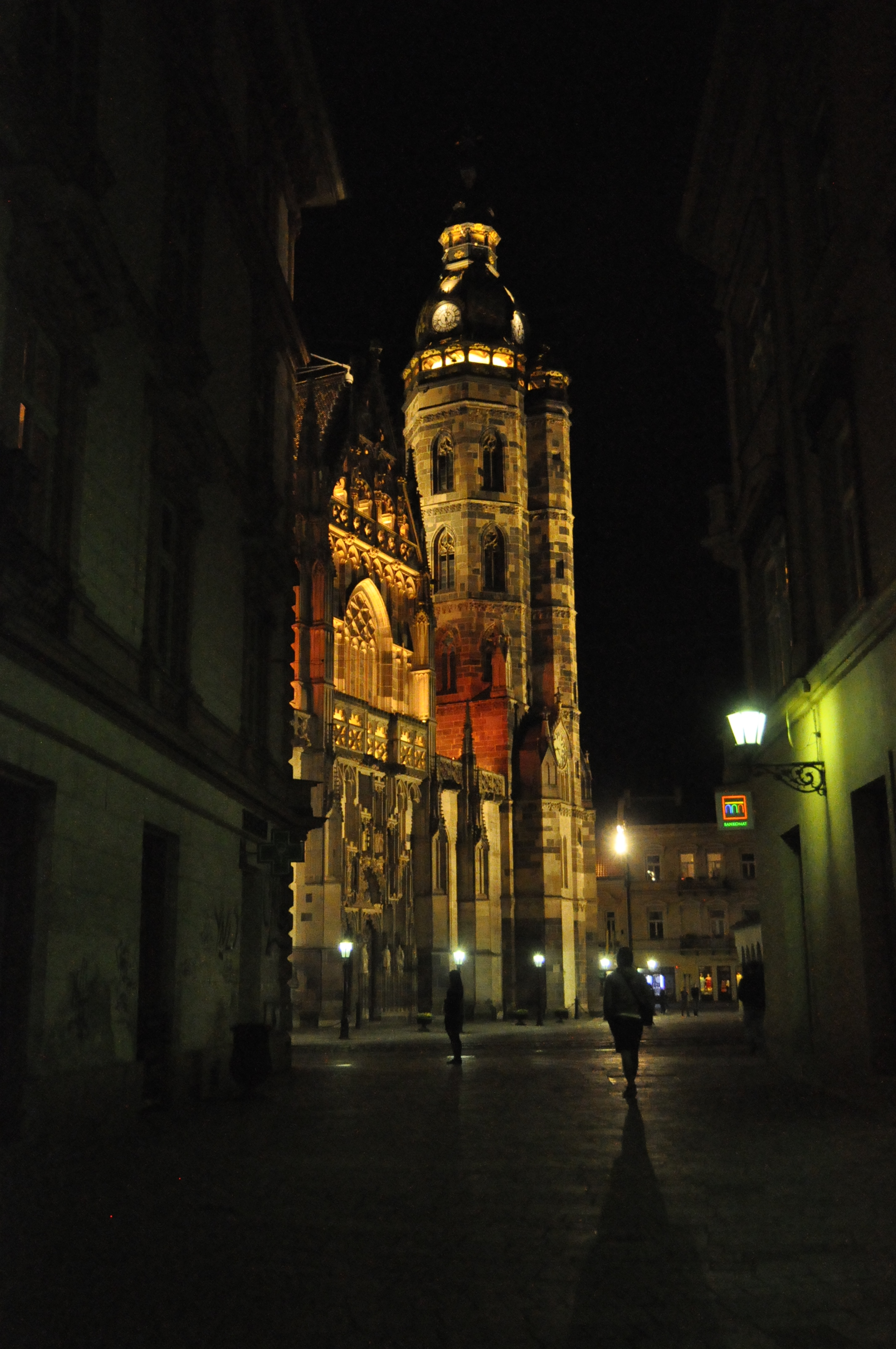
Night view from Mlynská Street

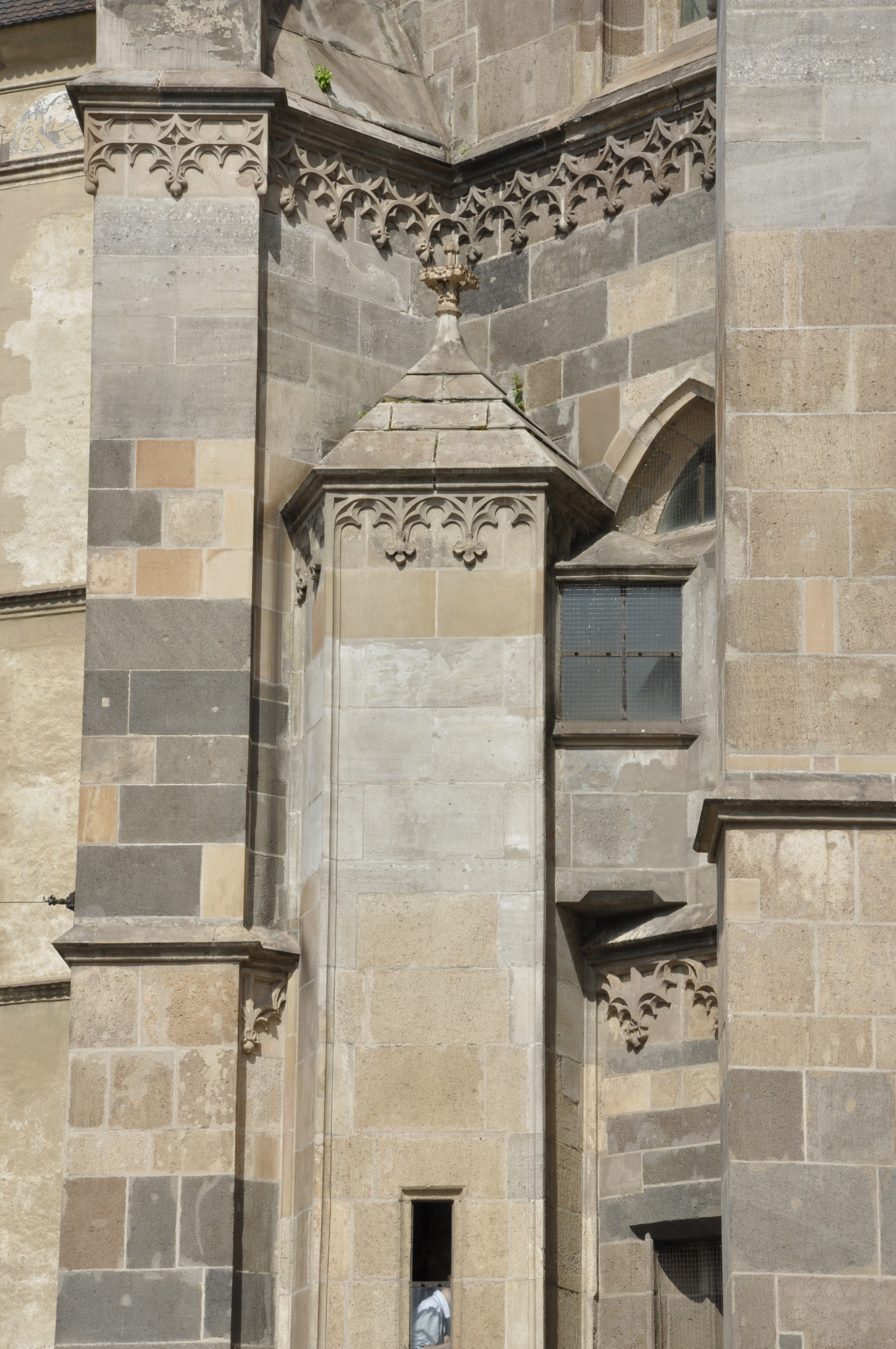
Exterior of the cathedral

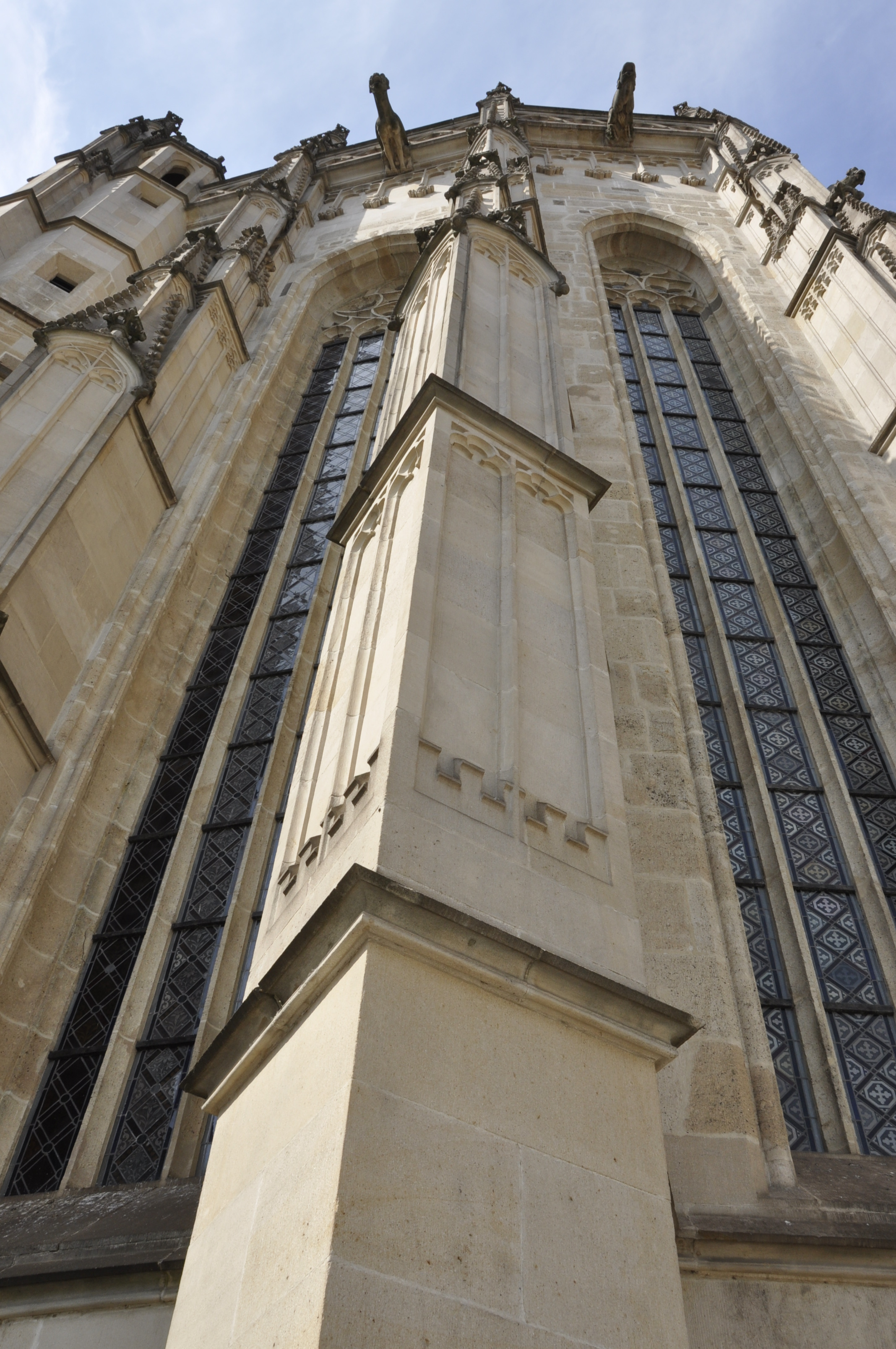
Details of facade

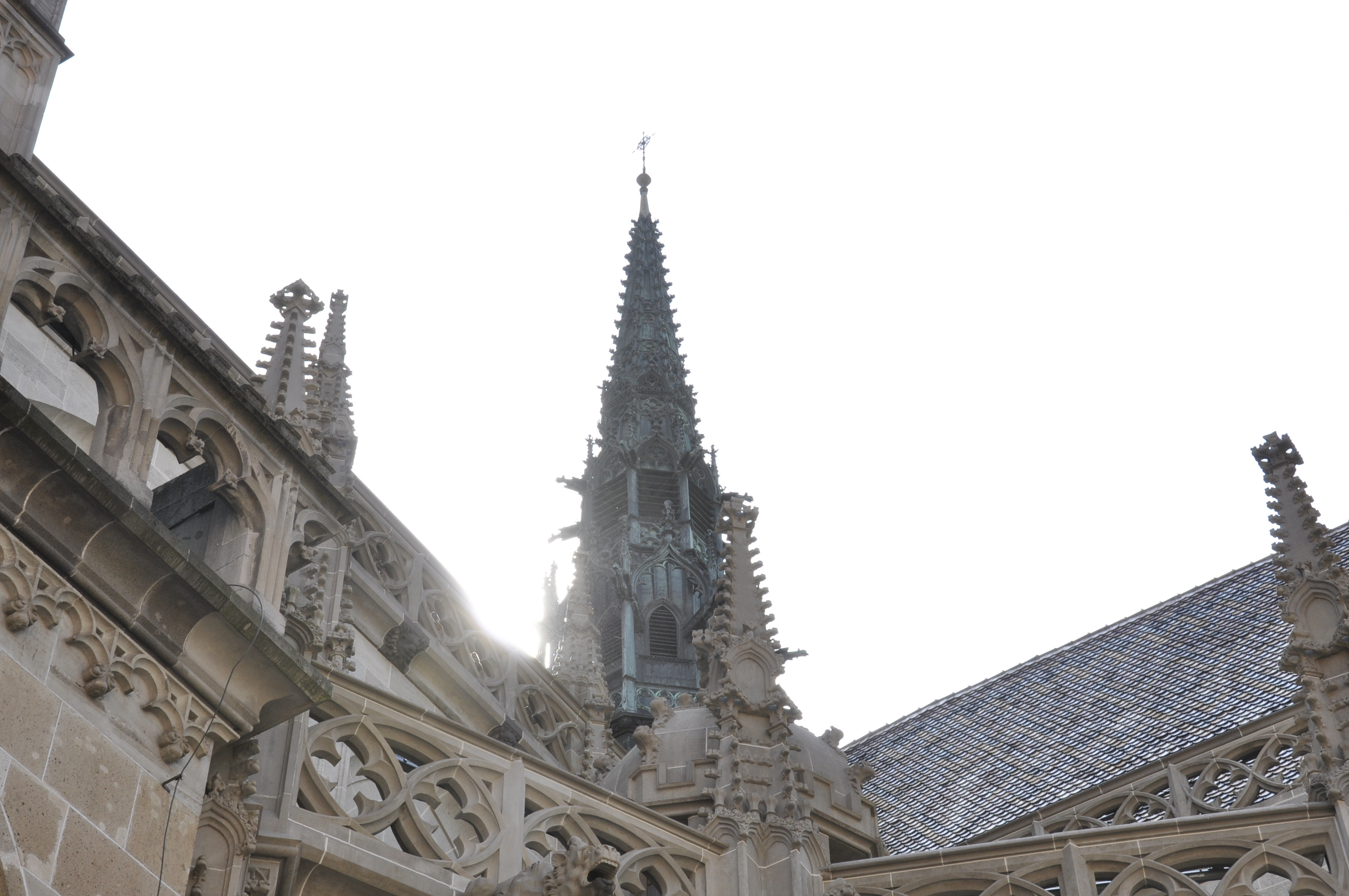
Matthias Tower

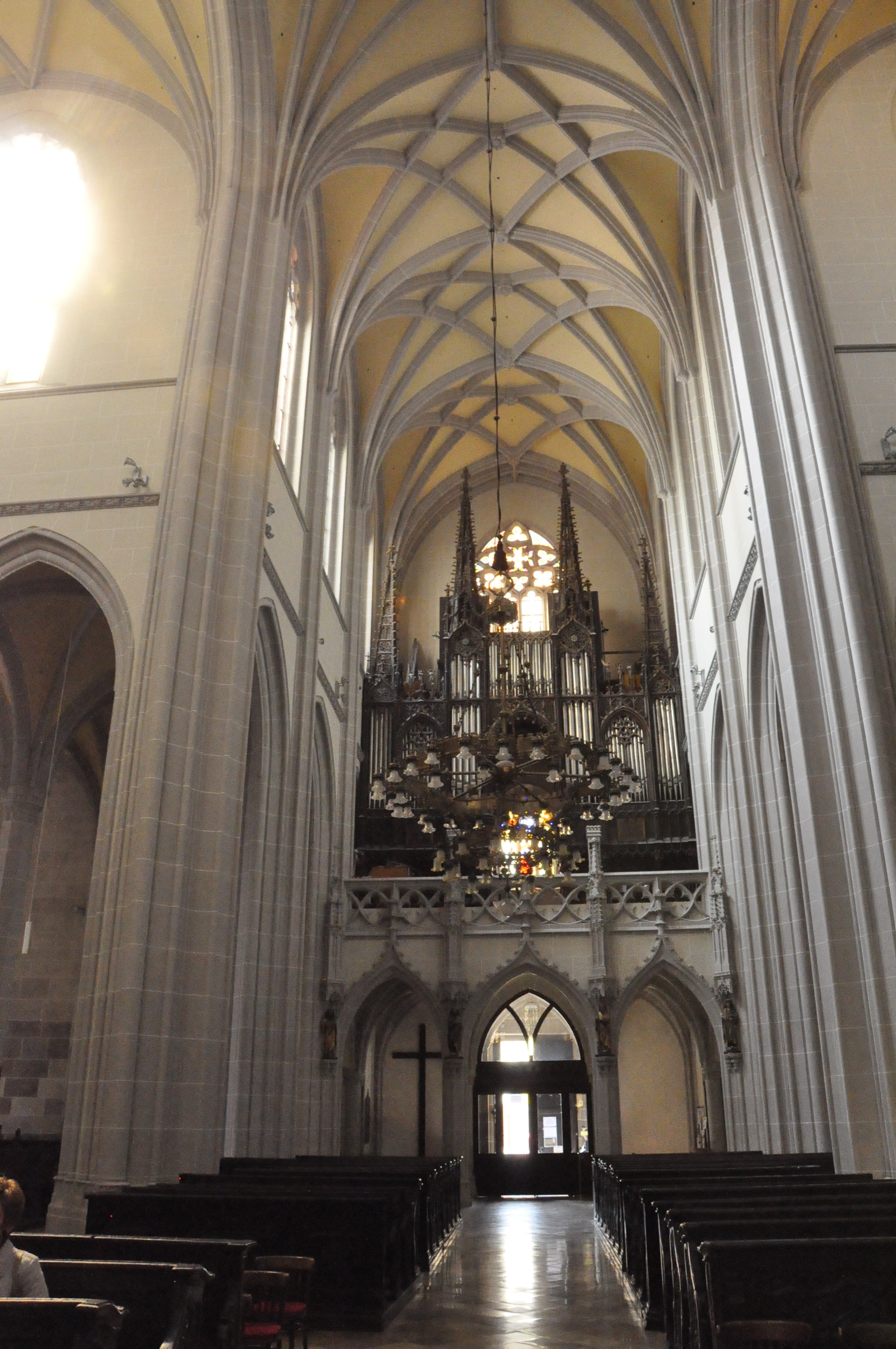
High choir

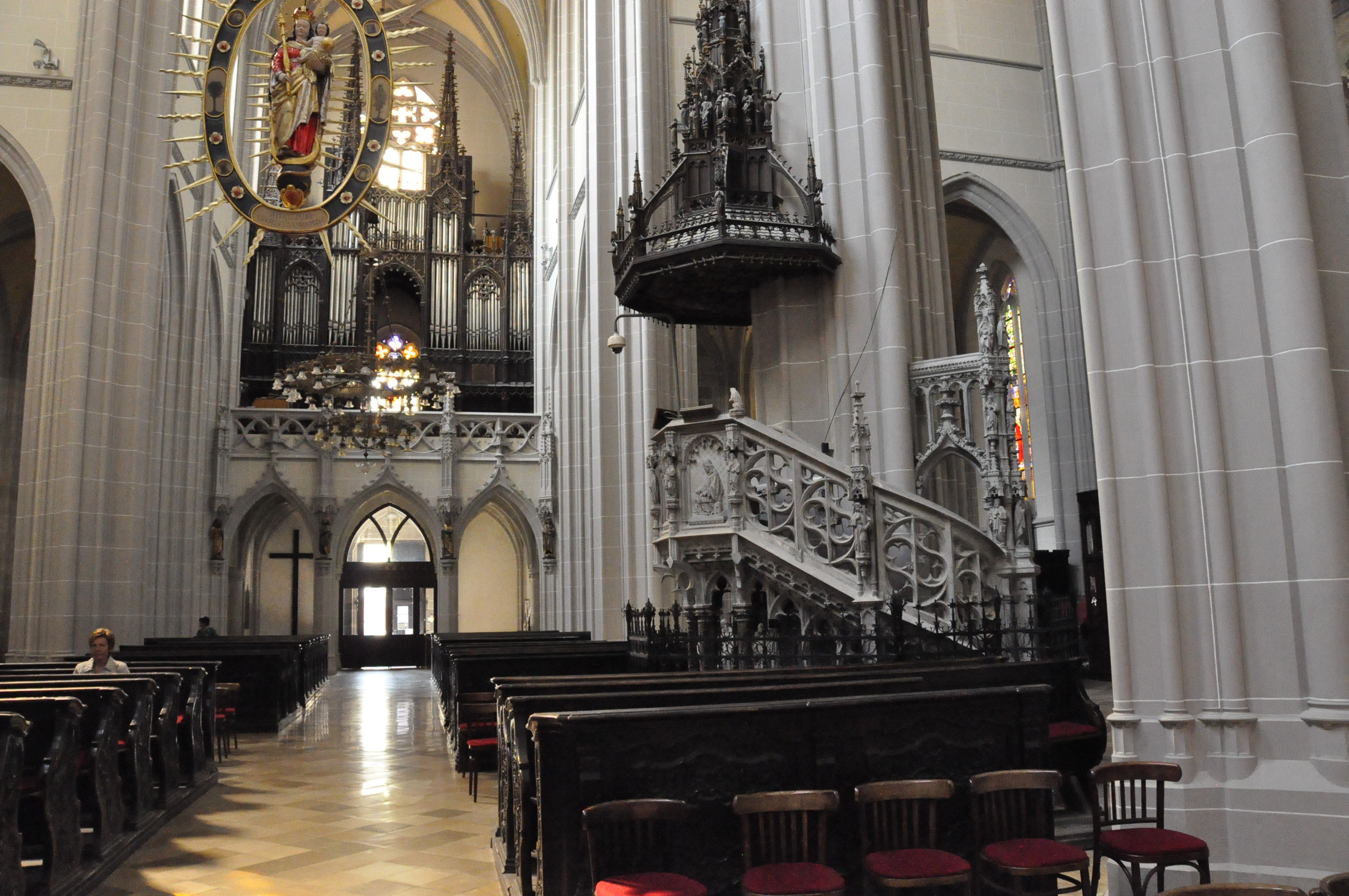
Interior view from the main altar

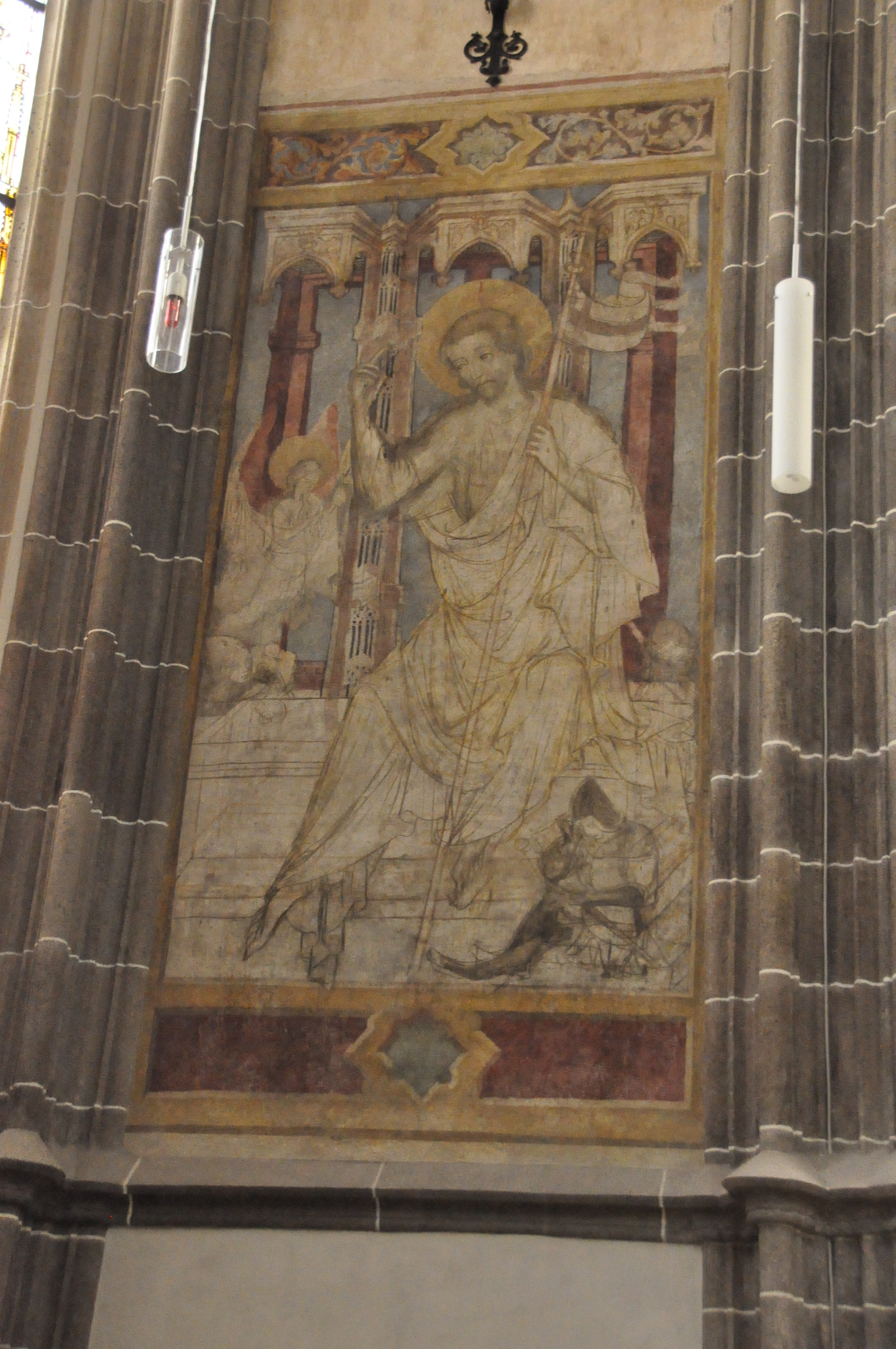
Wall painting

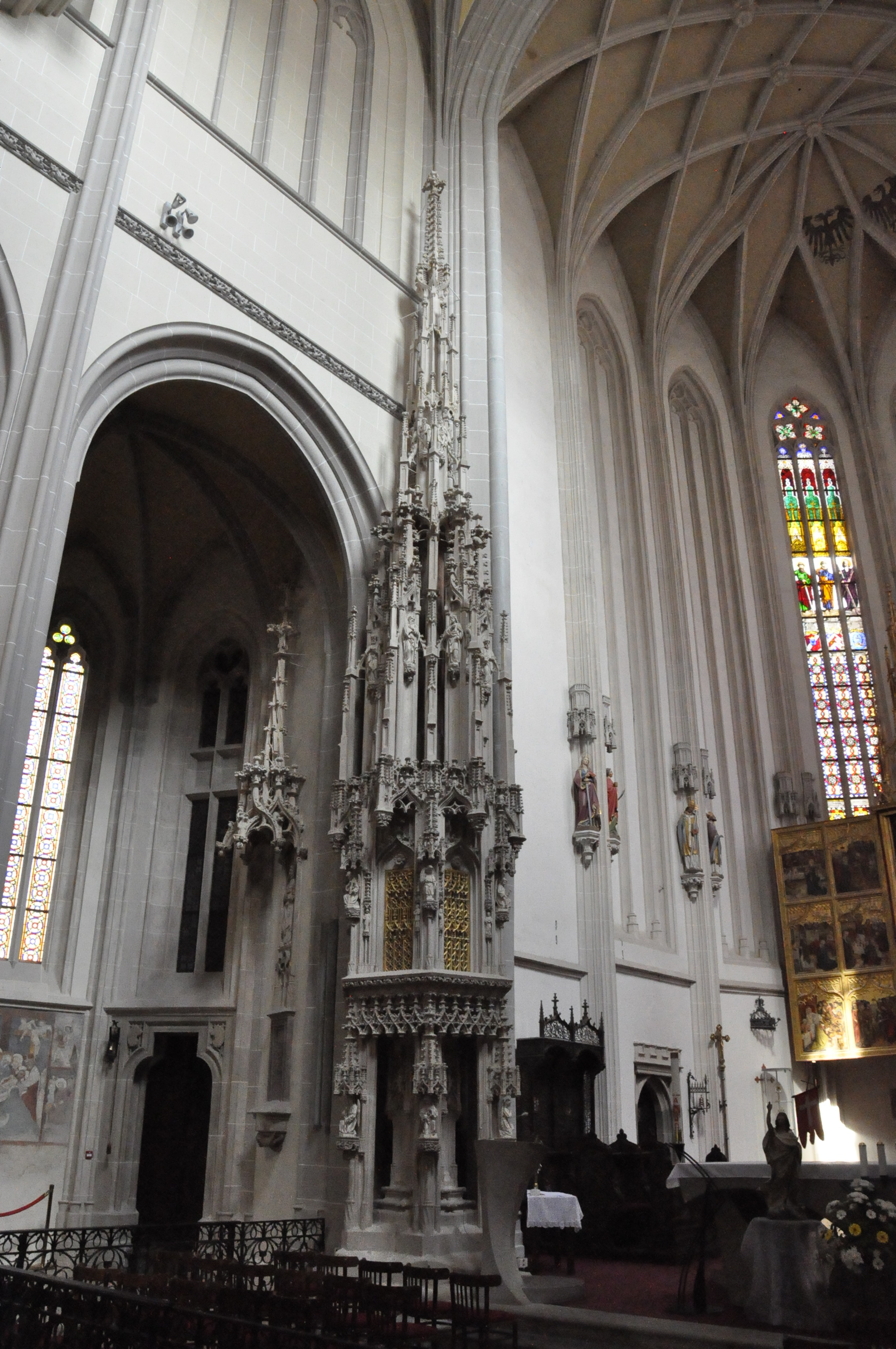
Pastophoria

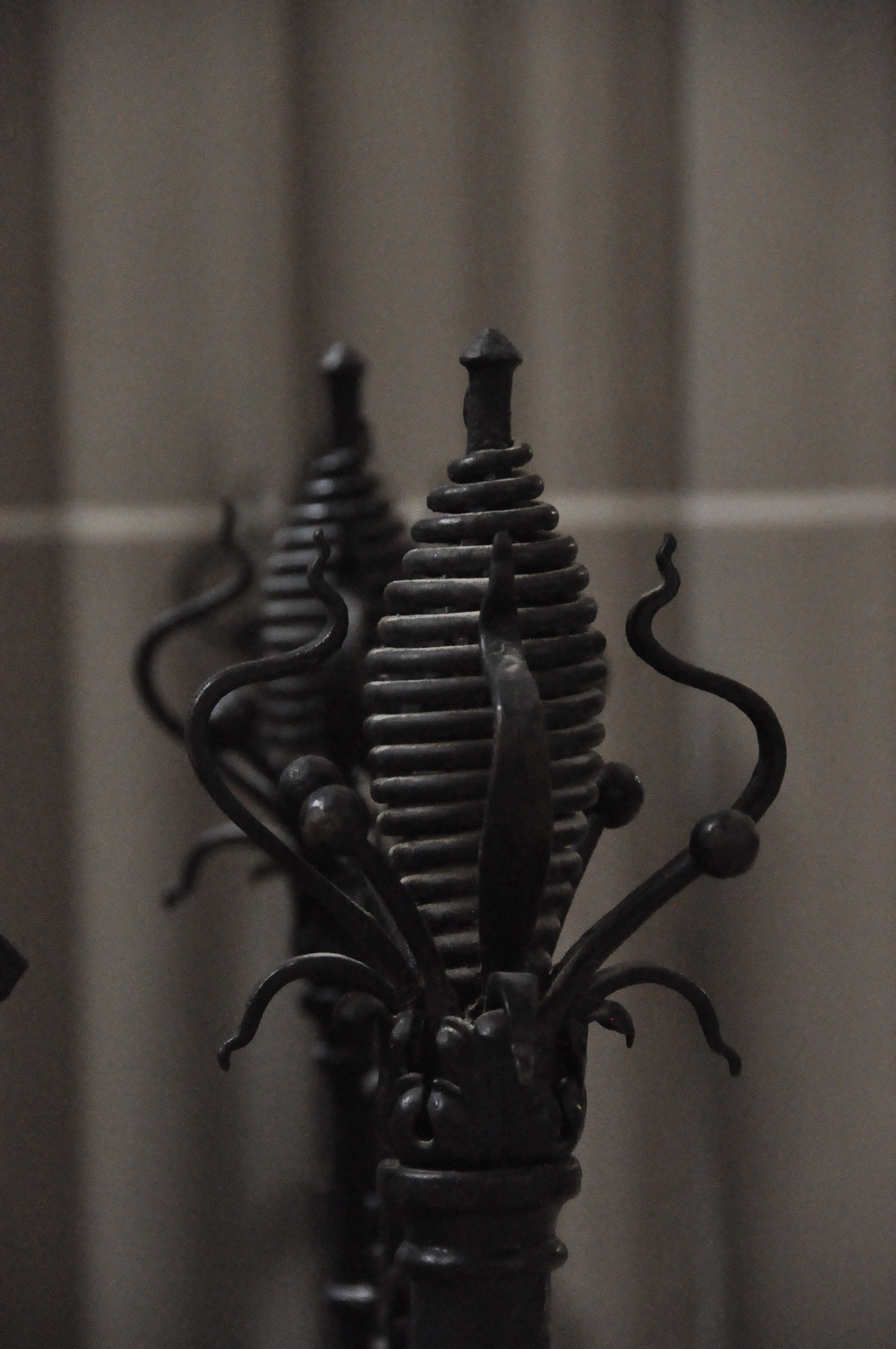
Ornamental detail

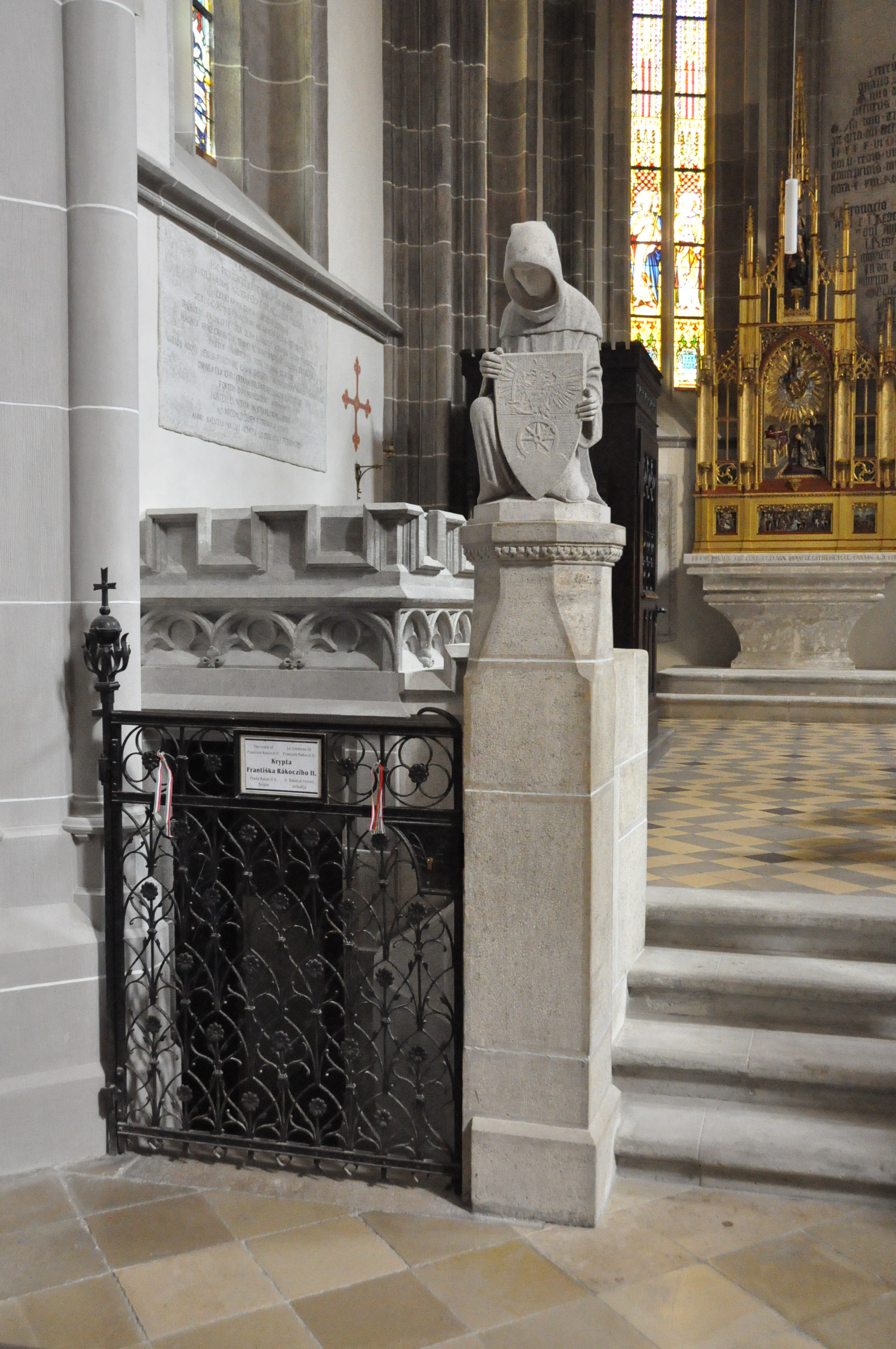
Entrance to the crypt of Rákocsi

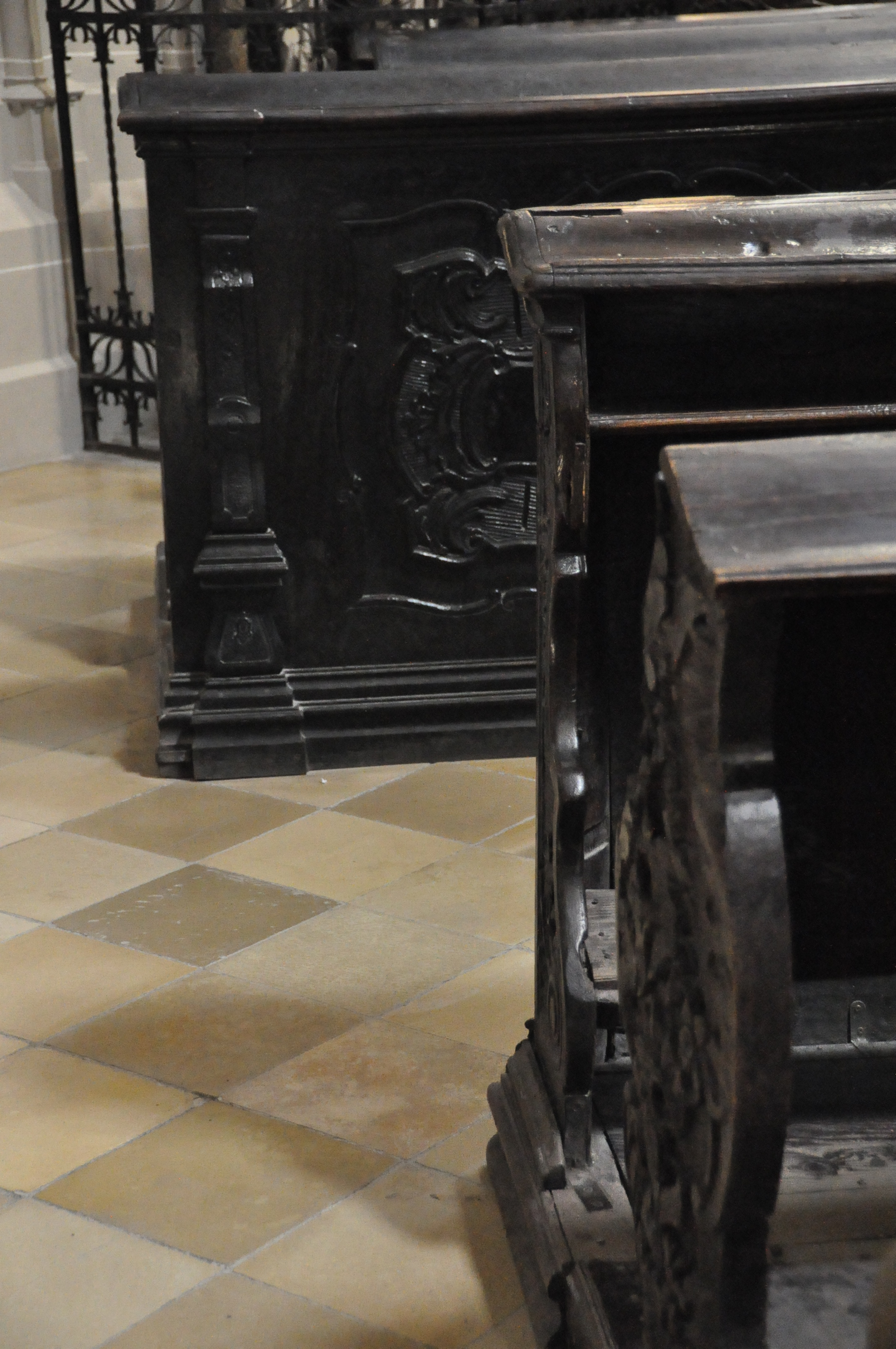
Pews

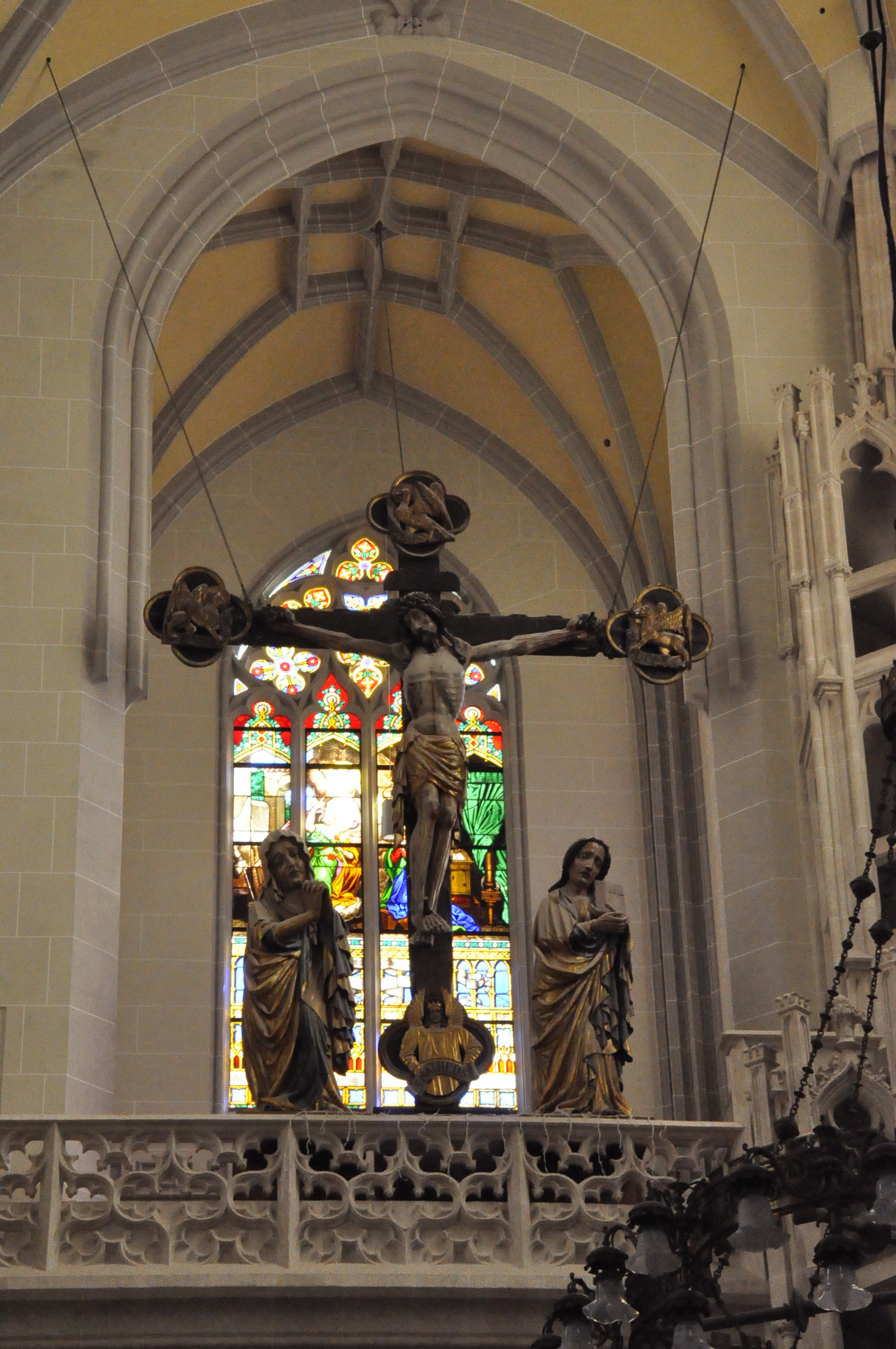
Calvary on the king's empora

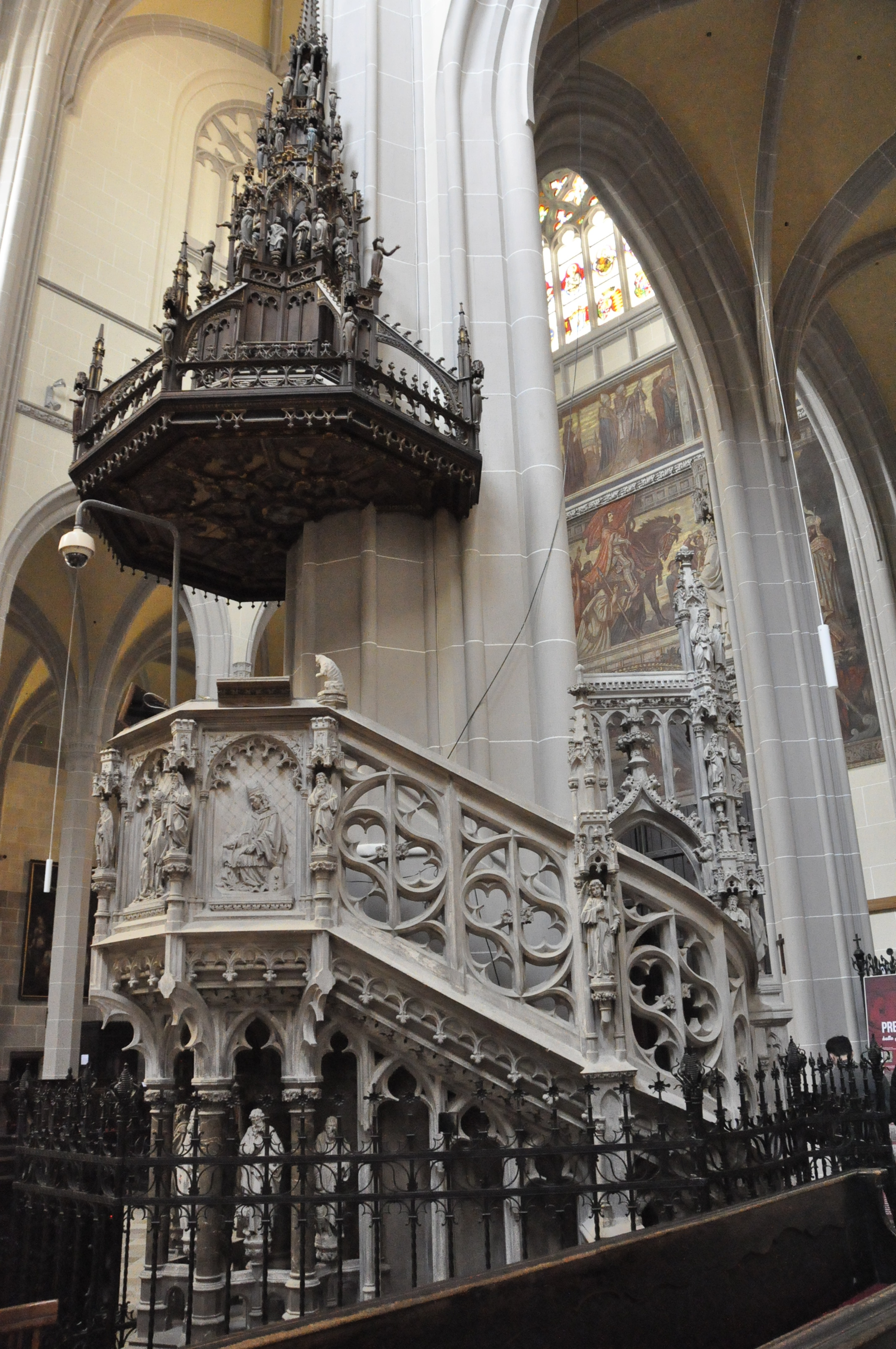
Neo-Gothic pulpit

== See also ==
- List of cathedrals in Slovakia

== Bibliography ==
- Borodáč, Ladislav (1975). Košický dóm. Národná kultúrna pamiatka (in Slovak). Martin: Východoslovenské vydavateľstvo pre Mestskú správu pamiatok v Košiciach.
- Dóm sv. Alžbety v Košiciach (in Slovak). Košice: Sáša pre Arcibiskupstvo Košice a Farnosť sv. Alžbety Košice. 2000. ISBN 80-967096-4-X.
- Judák, Viliam. "Katedrála svätej Alžbety v Košiciach". Pútnik svätovojtešský : kalendár na rok 2011. Příprava vydání Mária Vyskočová a Slavomír Ondica (in Slovak). Trnava: Spolok svätého Vojtecha, ročník 139. pp. 54–56. ISBN 978-80-7162-824-8.
- Lukačin, Alfonz (1999). Staviteľ chrámu (in Slovak). Košice: PressPrint. ISBN 80-968272-1-9.
- Markušová, Kristína (1998). Dóm sv. Alžbety. Sprievodca po košických kostoloch (in Slovak). Košice: Štroffek pre Historickú spoločnosť Imricha Henszlmanna. ISBN 9788096780006.
- Poláková, Mália (1983). Dóm sv. Alžbety v Košiciach. Národná kultúrna pamiatka (in Slovak). Martin: Obzor pre Východoslovenský krajský výbor Združenia katolíckeho duchovenstva Pacem in terris a Rímskokatolícky farský úrad sv. Alžbety v Košiciach.
- Wick, Vojtech (1936). Dóm svätej Alžbety v Košiciach (in Slovak). Košice: Tlačiareň svätej Alžbety.
