= Toyota Crown =

Full-size car

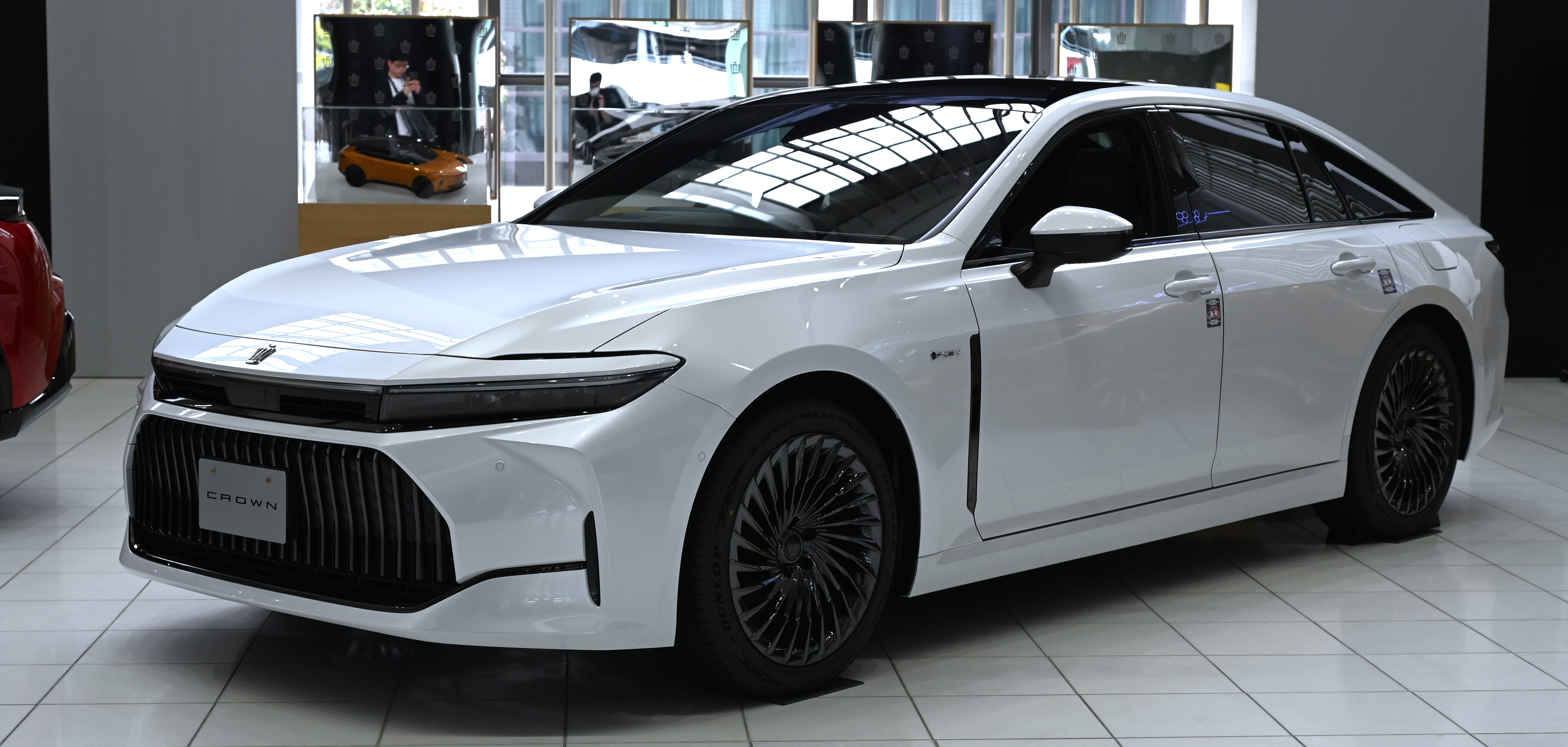
- 2024 Toyota Crown Sedan Z FCEV (KZSM30, Japan)

Overview
- Manufacturer: Toyota
- Production: 1955–present
- Assembly: Japan: Toyota City, Aichi (Honsha plant: 1955–1959; Motomachi plant: 1959–present; Tsutsumi plant: 2022–present); Tahara, Aichi (Tahara plant: 2004-2005); Australia: Port Melbourne (Australian Motor Industries: 1967–1980); New Zealand: Christchurch (Steel's Motor Assemblies: 1973–1980); China: Tianjin (TFTM: 2005–2020); Indonesia: Jakarta (1976–1984; 1989–2000); Philippines: Parañaque (1967–1984; 1989–1997); Santa Rosa, Laguna (1997–1999)

Body and chassis
- Class: Full-size car (E)
- Body style: 4-door notchback sedan (1955–present); 4-door hardtop sedan (1974–1999); 4-door fastback sedan (2022–present); 2-door hardtop coupe (1967–1983); 3/5-door wagon (1955–2007); 5-door SUV (2023–present); 2-door coupe utility (pickup, 1962–1971)
- Layout: Front-engine, rear-wheel-drive; Front-engine, four-wheel-drive (1995–present)
- Related: Toyota Crown Majesta (1991–2020); Lexus GS (1991–2011)

Chronology
- Predecessor: Toyota RH
- Successor: Toyota Corona Mark II (North America, for S60/S70 model); Toyota Avalon (XX50) (China, for S210 model); Toyota Soarer (hardtop coupe)

The Toyota Crown (Japanese: トヨタ・クラウン, Hepburn: Toyota Kuraun) is an automobile which has been produced by Toyota in Japan since 1955. It is primarily a line of executive cars that is marketed as an upscale offering in the Toyota lineup.

In North America, the first through fourth generations were offered from 1958 through 1972, being replaced by the Corona Mark II. The Crown nameplate returned to the North American market in 2022, when the sixteenth-generation model was released. The Crown has also been partially succeeded in export markets by its closely related sibling, the Lexus GS, which since its debut in 1991 as the Toyota Aristo has always shared the Crown's platform and powertrain options. Later models of the GS and Crown have taken on a very strong aesthetic kinship through shared design cues.

In 2022, Toyota unveiled four different Crown models to replace the fifteenth-generation model. The first model that is available is the Crossover-type Crown. The remaining three models: Sedan, Sport, and Estate, were released between 2023 and 2024 respectively, and are available in hybrid, plug-in hybrid, and fuel cell powertrains depending on the model.

== History ==
Toyota Crown logo used between 2003 and 2018.

Introduced in 1955 as the Toyopet Crown, it has served as the mainstream sedan from Toyota in the Japanese market throughout its existence and holds the distinction of being one of the longest-running passenger-car nameplate affixed to any Toyota model. Its traditional competitors in Japan and Asia were the defunct Nissan Cedric/Gloria/Fuga, Honda Legend, Mazda Luce, Isuzu Bellel and Mitsubishi Debonair.

Formerly only available at Toyota Store dealers in Japan, the Crown has been popular for government usage, whether as a police car or for transporting government officials. It has also been popular with Japanese companies as company cars along with use as a taxicab. While the base Crown was available for many years aimed at the taxicab market, the increasing opulence and price of the Crown line led to the creation of the Comfort in 1995 as a more affordable alternative. Outside Japan, the larger Lexus LS took over the role of Toyota's flagship sedan in 1989 in the company's global lineup.

Toyota's "Discover Crown Spirit Project" is a program in which Japanese Toyota dealers fully restore instances of every generation of the Crown to show that even the oldest Crown still works.

Having been in production since 1955, the Crown is Toyota's second longest running model nameplate in Japan after the Land Cruiser, and seventh in the world after the Mercedes-Benz S-Class (1954), Chevrolet Corvette (1953), Land Cruiser and Nissan Patrol (both 1951), Volkswagen Transporter (1950), Ford F-Series (1947), and Chevrolet Suburban (1935).

== Exports ==
The Crown was first exported to the United States from 1958 to 1973 as the first model Toyota exported to the country. In 1960, Toyota temporarily suspended exports to the region as the Crown was not capable of speeds needed on American freeways, before introducing an improved model. The Crown was also exported to Canada from 1964 to 1972, and Mexico from 1959 to 1964.

Exports to Europe began in 1964 with the first car going to Finland. Other European countries which saw early imports of the Crown included the Netherlands and Belgium. The United Kingdom was another European market until the early 1980s. Australia was another important export market for the Crown – to the extent that it was manufactured there from the mid-1960s until the late 1980s using many local components. It was discontinued when the button car plan was put into effect.

Exports to New Zealand began in 1968 and local CKD kit assembly of the Deluxe sedan started in 1973 (under contract at Steel's Motor Assemblies in Christchurch alongside the Corona). The model was replaced in NZ assembly by the Cressida in 1979 though limited imports of Japanese assembled cars continued for several more years.

The island nations of Aruba and Curaçao in the Southern Caribbean also imported the Crown starting from the second generation (S40) in 1965 in Curaçao up until importation of the tenth generation (S150). It was discontinued in 1998 due to the high price and low demand combined with the introduction of the Lexus GS series.

In 2019, a small number of fifteenth-generation Crowns were exported to Indonesia for use as an official vehicle by cabinet ministers and other government officials.

The sixteenth-generation Crown that was introduced in 2022 is exported to about 40 countries with an expected annual sales volume of around 200,000 units.

== Toyopet Crown – First generation (RS/S10/S20/S30; 1955) ==
Toyopet Crown – First generation
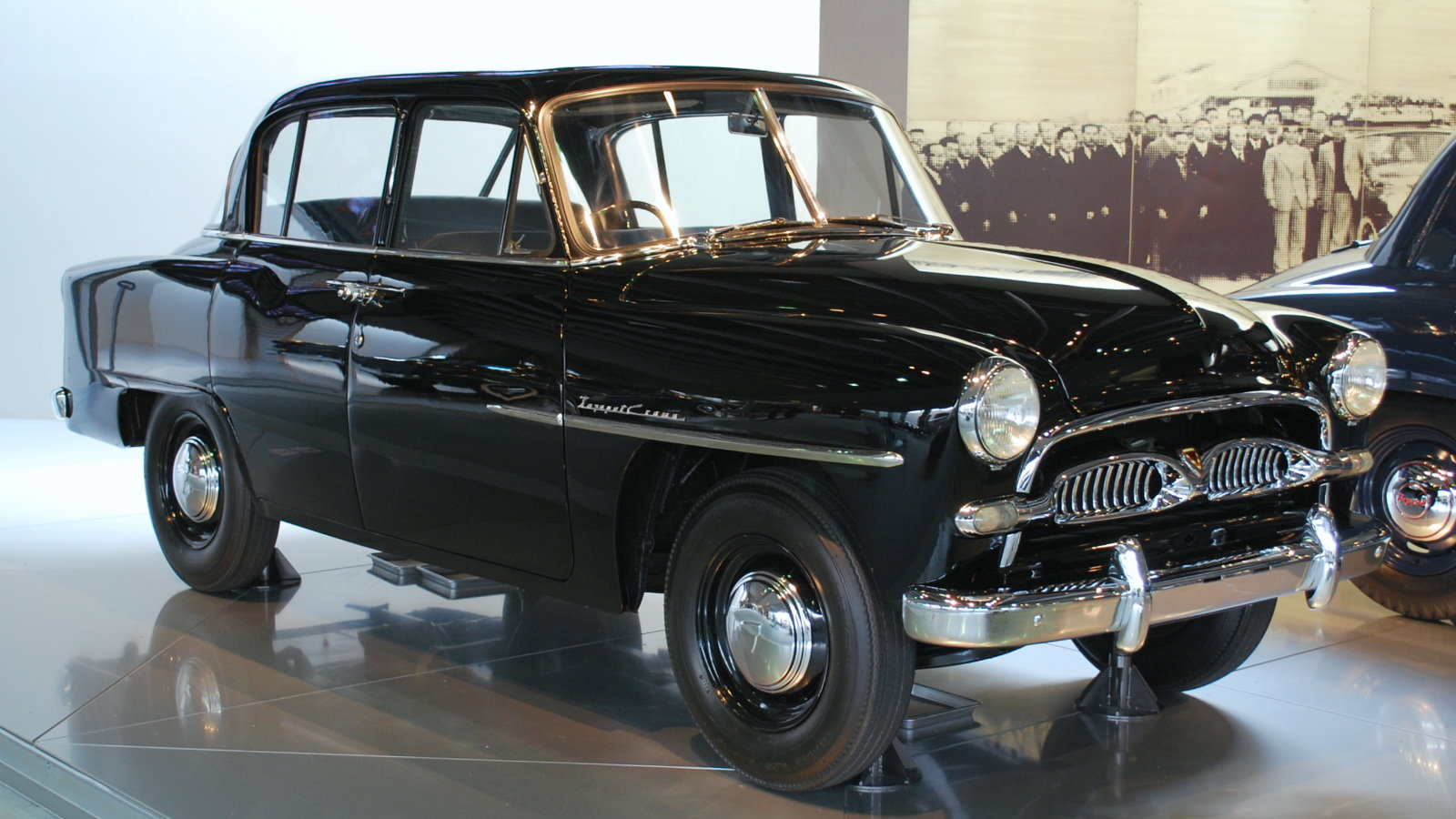
- 1955 Toyopet Crown RS

Overview
- Model code: RS; S10; S20; S30
- Also called: Toyopet Masterline (commercial models)
- Production: January 1955 – September 1962
- Assembly: Japan: Koromo plant (now Honsha plant: 1955–1958); Motomachi plant (1959–1962)
- Designer: Kenya Nakamura

Body and chassis
- Body style: 4-door sedan; 2/4-door station wagon
- Layout: Front-engine, rear-wheel-drive
- Related: Toyopet Master; Toyopet Master Ribbon

Powertrain
- Engine: 1,453 cc R I4 (RS, RS20); 1,897 cc 3R I4 (RS30); 1,491 cc C diesel I4 (CS20); 3,386 cc B I6 (Patrol Car/Ambulance); 3,878 cc F I6 (Patrol Car/Ambulance)

Dimensions
- Wheelbase: 2,530 mm (99.6 in)
- Length: 4,285 mm (168.7 in)
- Width: 1,679 mm (66.1 in)
- Height: 1,524 mm (60.0 in)
- Curb weight: 1,152–1,216 kg (2,540–2,681 lb)

The Crown was introduced in January 1955 in Japan to meet the demands of public transportation. The Crown was intended for private purchase, while the Master served in a commercial form as a taxi, both with the same 1.5 L Type R engine used on their previous car, the Toyopet Super. The front doors open conventionally, and the rear doors are "suicide doors", a feature also utilized on the Toyota AA, Toyota's first car. Small engine displacements were used to keep the vehicle affordable, as the Japanese government began to impose an annual road tax to help develop and maintain a national transportation infrastructure in 1950. The appearance of the Crown shows some similarities with the European Ford Versailles and Simca Vedette. The Toyota Patrol was a police car version of the 1955 Crown. It featured many differences from the standard car, including a more reinforced chassis with the more powerful B 6-cylinder 3.4 L engine from the Toyota BX truck. In a similar way, an ambulance based on the Crown was also built. In 1956, both of these vehicles were upgraded to the F 3.9 L engine and remained in production until 1959.

The Crown was much more popular than the Master due to the more compliant suspension of the Crown, and while the Master was intended for taxi service, the Crown was more accepted by the market over the Master, and more Crowns were sold into taxi service than the Master. The Crown was designed to replace the Super but Toyota was not sure if its independent front coil suspension and its suicide type rear doors were too radical for the taxi market to bear. So the Super was updated, renamed the Master and sold in tandem to the Crown, at Toyota Store locations. When sales of the Crown proved worthwhile, the Master was discontinued in November 1956 after being in production for only one year, and production facilities for the Master were transferred to the Crown. While the Master was discontinued the commercial vehicle based thereon, the Masterline, continued to be offered (utilities, wagons and vans) until 1959. A six-door wagon known as the Airport Limousine was shown as a concept car at the 1961 Tokyo Motor Show. It did not go into production.

In December 1955, the Crown Deluxe (RSD) was introduced, a posher model equipped with a radio and heater as standard. The initial RS model received a cosmetic update in 1958 to become the RS20, now with hooded headlights and a single-piece front windshield. In October 1959, Japan's first diesel-engine passenger car, the Crown Diesel, was introduced. Its C-series engine only had 40 PS (29 kW). In October 1960, the 1.5 L R engine was complemented by the larger 1.9 L (1,896 cc) 3R engine for a model called the RS30, originally only available in the Deluxe version. The 1900 was also available with the new two-speed Toyoglide automatic transmission. In April 1961, a Crown Standard 1900 was added.

Its coil and double wishbone independent front suspension was a departure from the leaf sprung beam axle front suspension used on most previous models but was similar to the independent front suspension used on the 1947 Toyopet SA. The live axle rear suspension was similar to that used on most of the previous models (unlike the trailing arm rear suspension used on the SA). Taxi versions were produced and beginning in March 1959 commercial versions of the vehicle were also available, as an estate wagon and a three- or six-seat coupe utility. These took over the "Toyopet Masterline" name in the Japanese domestic market, but usually received "Crown" badges in the export. The "Crown" name was previously in use by the Imperial limousine manufactured by Chrysler in the early 1950s.

In 1958, it introduced a ball joint suspension. Production of the double-cab Masterline pickup (RR19) started in April 1957 by the former Central Motors.

In August 1957, three Toyota delegates with the intent to establish a sales company in the United States introduced a white and black Crown and Crown Deluxe at a public relations event attended by dealers and the media. Both models were constructed with 50% thicker steel than the average American car at the time and the black Deluxe model was nicely appointed with lots of chrome and luxurious items like a radio, heater and whitewall tires which prompted the press to liken it to a "baby Cadillac". This promising initial showing along with the strong reputation of the Crown in Japan gave Toyota the confidence to pursue exports to the United States despite known high-speed performance issues. As a publicity stunt to demonstrate the car's reliability, Toyota staged a campaign common to American automakers: a coast-to-coast endurance run from Los Angeles to New York. The Toyopet was barely able to limp into Las Vegas before the project had to be called off.

Toyota's first export to the United States began with 30 Crown Deluxes in June 1958 after establishing Toyota Motor Sales USA the previous October, the first directly managed retail dealer (Hollywood Toyota) the previous February, U.S. wholesale and import companies, and a parts warehouse in Long Beach. Toyota also signs up 45 dealers to sell cars in its initial year, growing to 70 dealers by 1960 and 90 by 1962. In the effort to obtain certification from the California Highway Patrol for the sale of the Crown in California, Toyota shipped the cars without headlights and installed General Electric sourced sealed beam units upon arrival which met the required standard for brightness.

Since the car was designed for the muddy, slow, unpaved Japanese roads, it failed the mass urban landscape of the US because of its inability to keep up with traffic on the faster interstate highways, along with stability, noise and vibration concerns. The car was also very rigid and heavy for its size at 2700 pounds. Motor Trend reported "The Toyopet is so rigid that jacking up one wheel at the rear bumper quickly lifted the other rear wheel". They also observed an average of 23.5 mpg combined city/highway for 407 miles. To remedy the performance issues along with the resulting breakage of parts from being overly stressed, Toyota introduced the newer RS22L and the RS32L series Crown with the larger 3R engine and other improvements for high-speed driving in July 1960.

For 1958, Toyota introduced the Crown in sedan form only (Standard and Deluxe) with a base price of US$2,187 (equivalent to about $24,405 in 2025). Options included $94 AM radio and $75 whitewall tires. By comparison, an optioned up Crown was $32 more than the base Chevy Del Ray and $10 more than the Rambler Rebel V8 sedan. Total sales for the initial year were 287. For 1959, sales were again limited to only sedan models and despite a price boost to $2,329 for the Deluxe model, sales more than tripled to 967 units. For 1960, Toyota added a wagon body style ($2,111 for the two-door, $2,211 for the four-door) but in the midst of Detroit's Big Three compact cars (Ford Falcon, Chevy Corvair and Plymouth Valiant), sales fell to 659 units. For 1961, the Crown was being sold with the newer 3R engine and alongside the new smaller Tiara model with the Crown's outgoing 1.5L engine. Only the Custom sedan and wagon were offered ($1,795 and $2,080 respectively). Total sales for 1961 reached only 225 units, trailing off to 74 for 1962, and finally 28 for 1963. Total sales for the Toyopet Crown RS series in the United States is 2,240.

By the end of 1960, Toyota Motor Sales USA had accumulated 1.42 million dollars in losses from lackluster sales of the Crown. To prevent any further loss, all passenger car imports were suspended and new management structures were established to refocus all sales efforts on the Toyota Land Cruiser with profitability expected from selling 50 to 60 per month until the development of a new car suitable for the US market.

In November 2000, Toyota released the Origin, a retro version of the RS series Crown to celebrate 100 million vehicles having been built in Japan.

=== Gallery ===
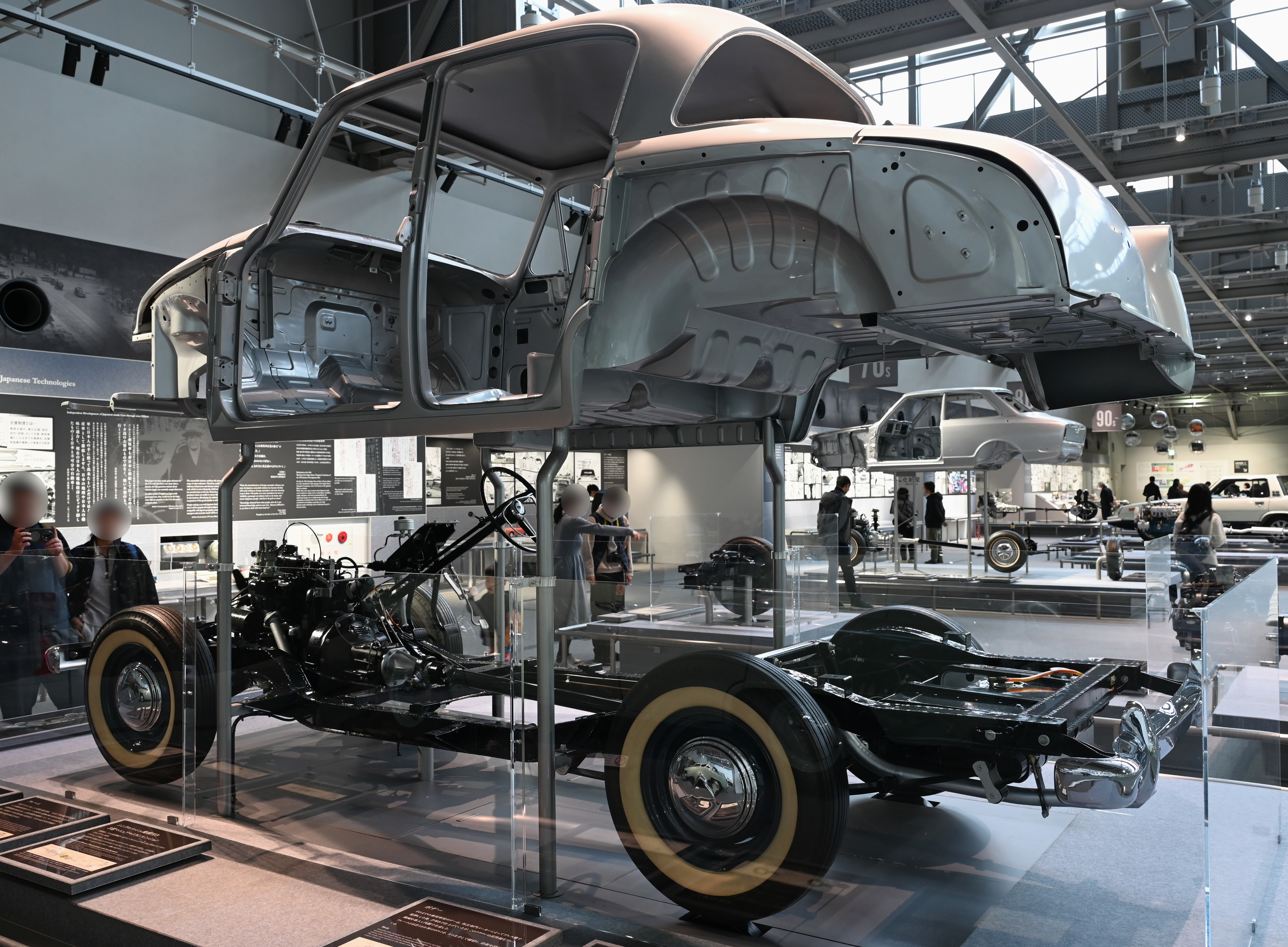
Crown RS cutaway, the body is lifted up and the chassis is on display

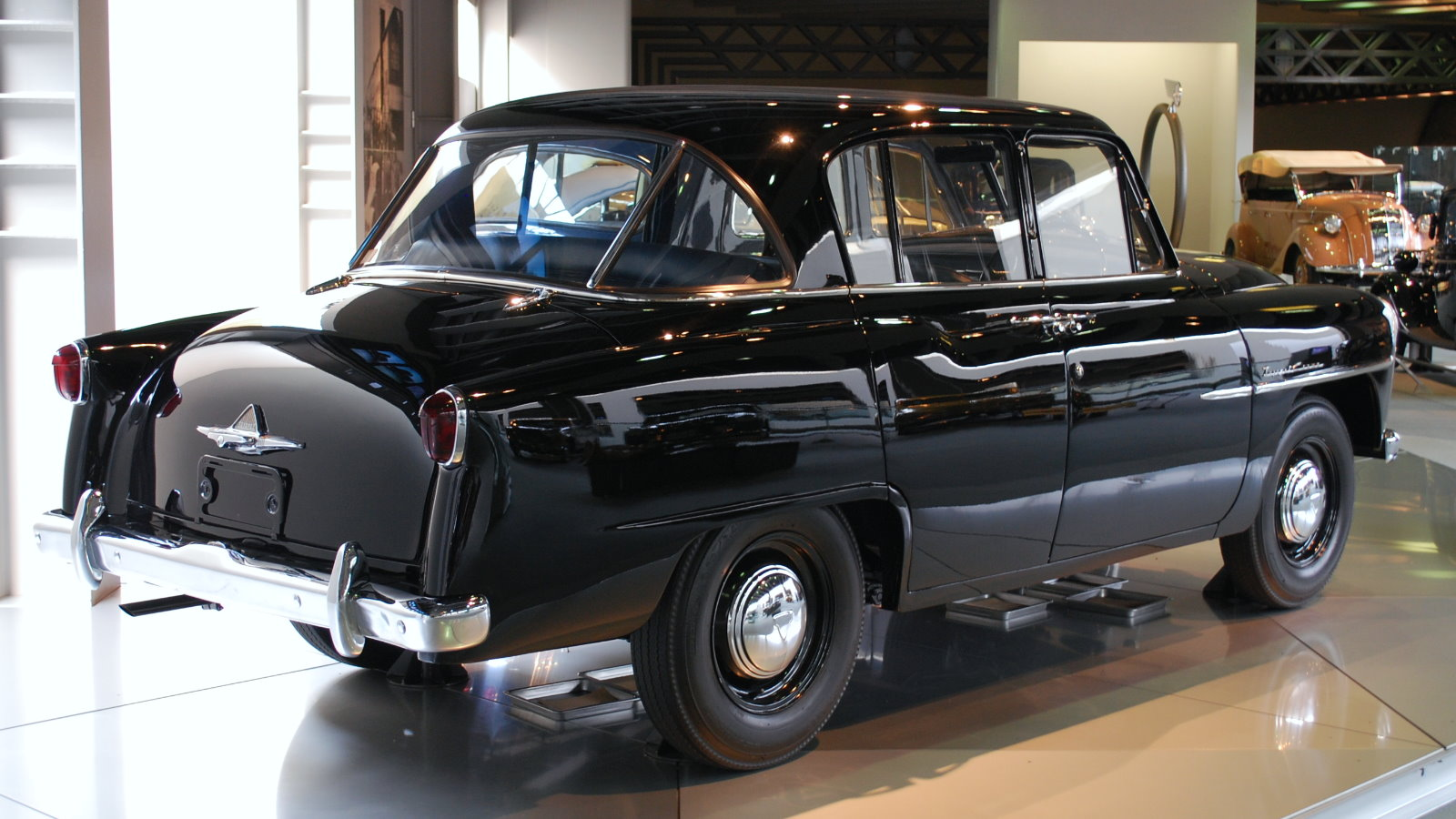
Rear view (RS)

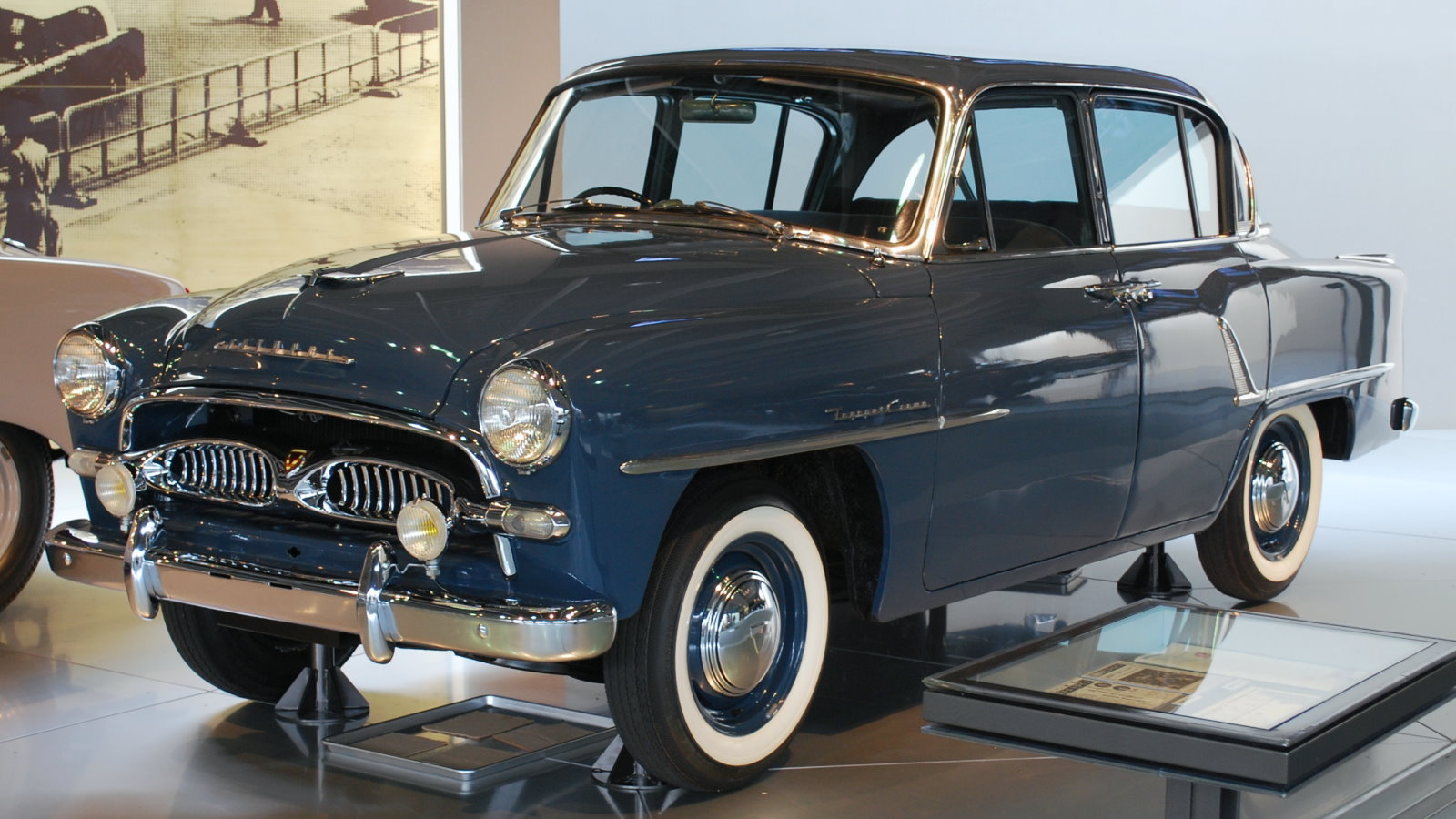
1955 Toyopet Crown Deluxe (RSD)

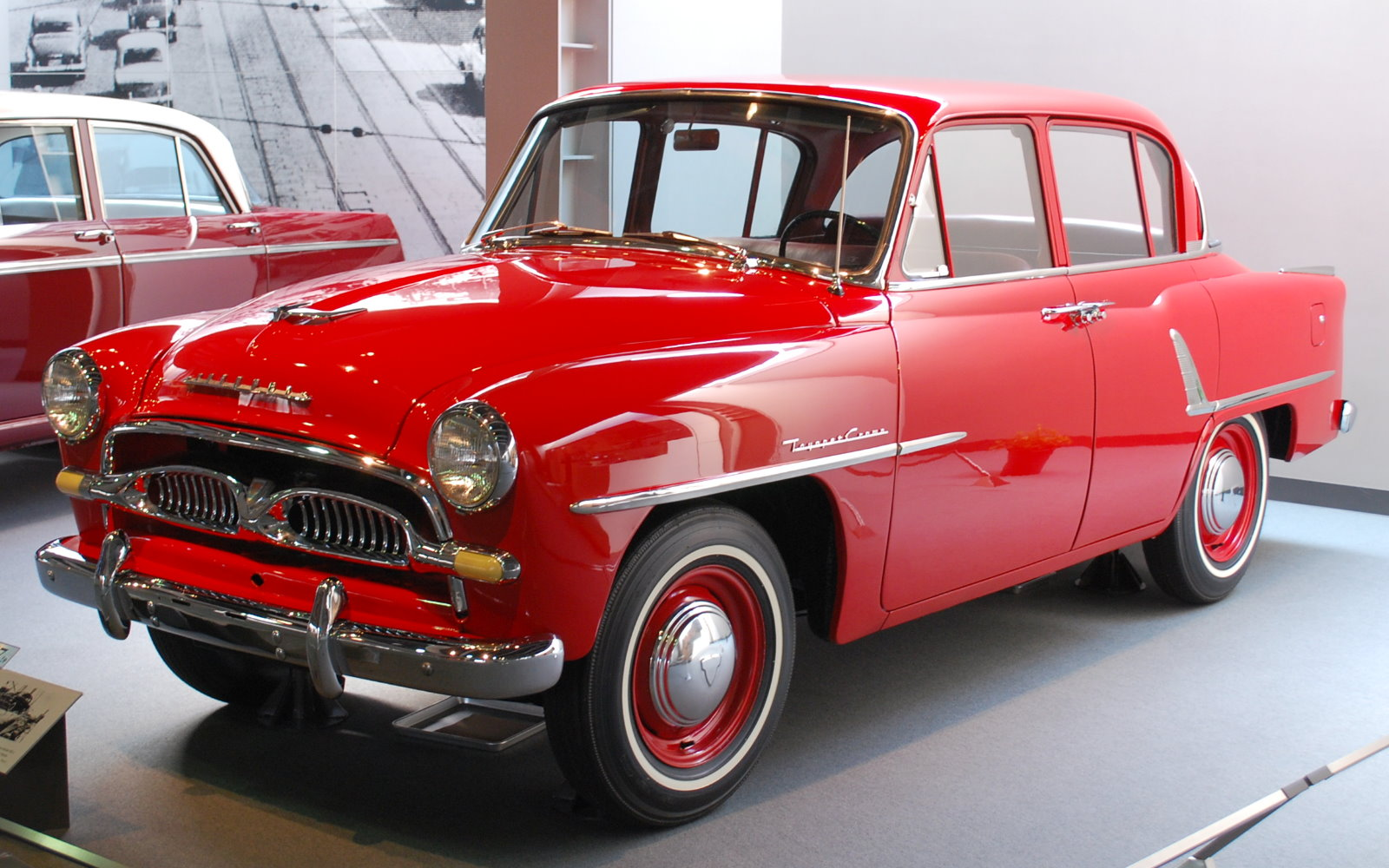
1957 Toyopet Crown (LHD, export model)

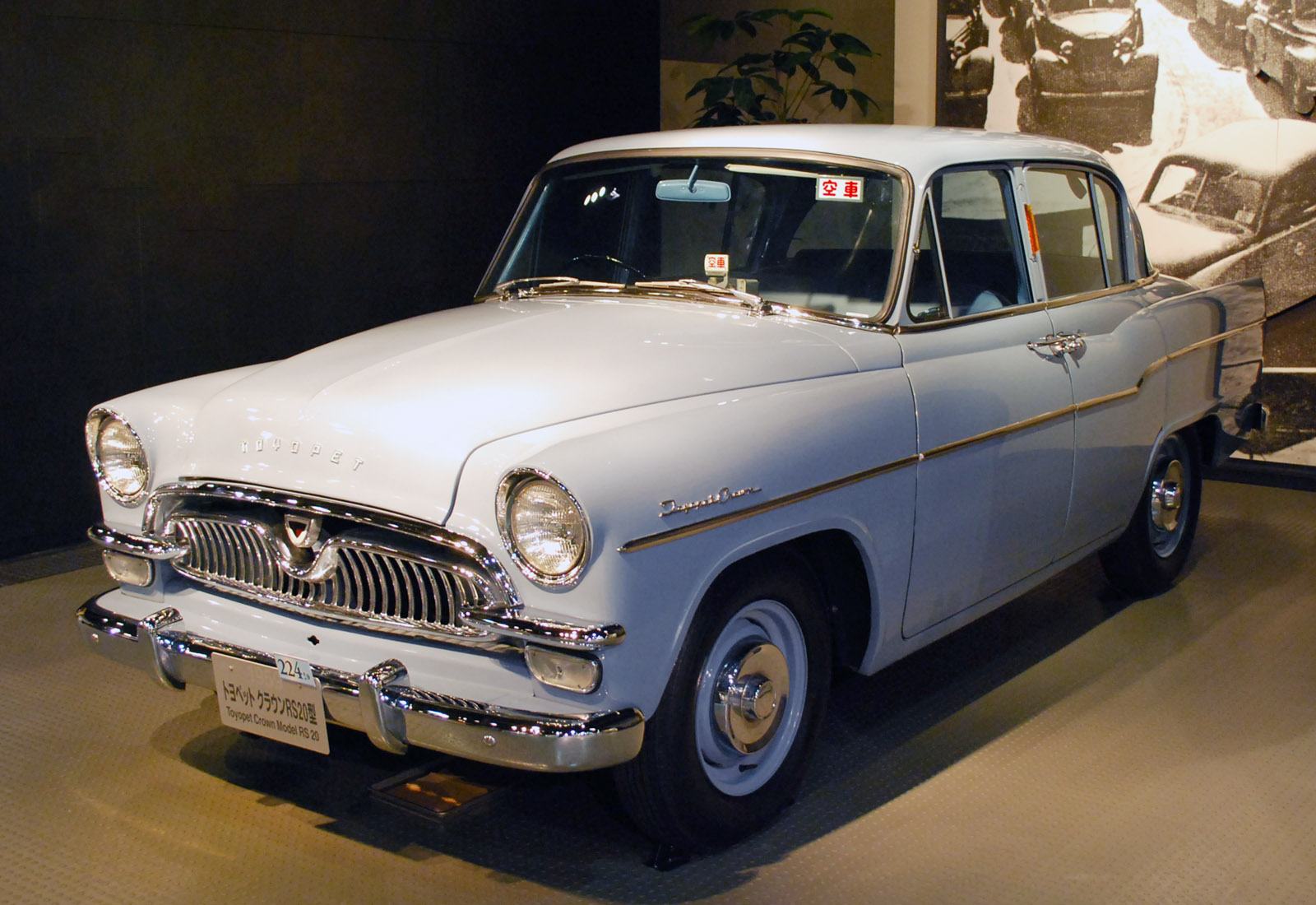
1959 Toyopet Crown (RS20)

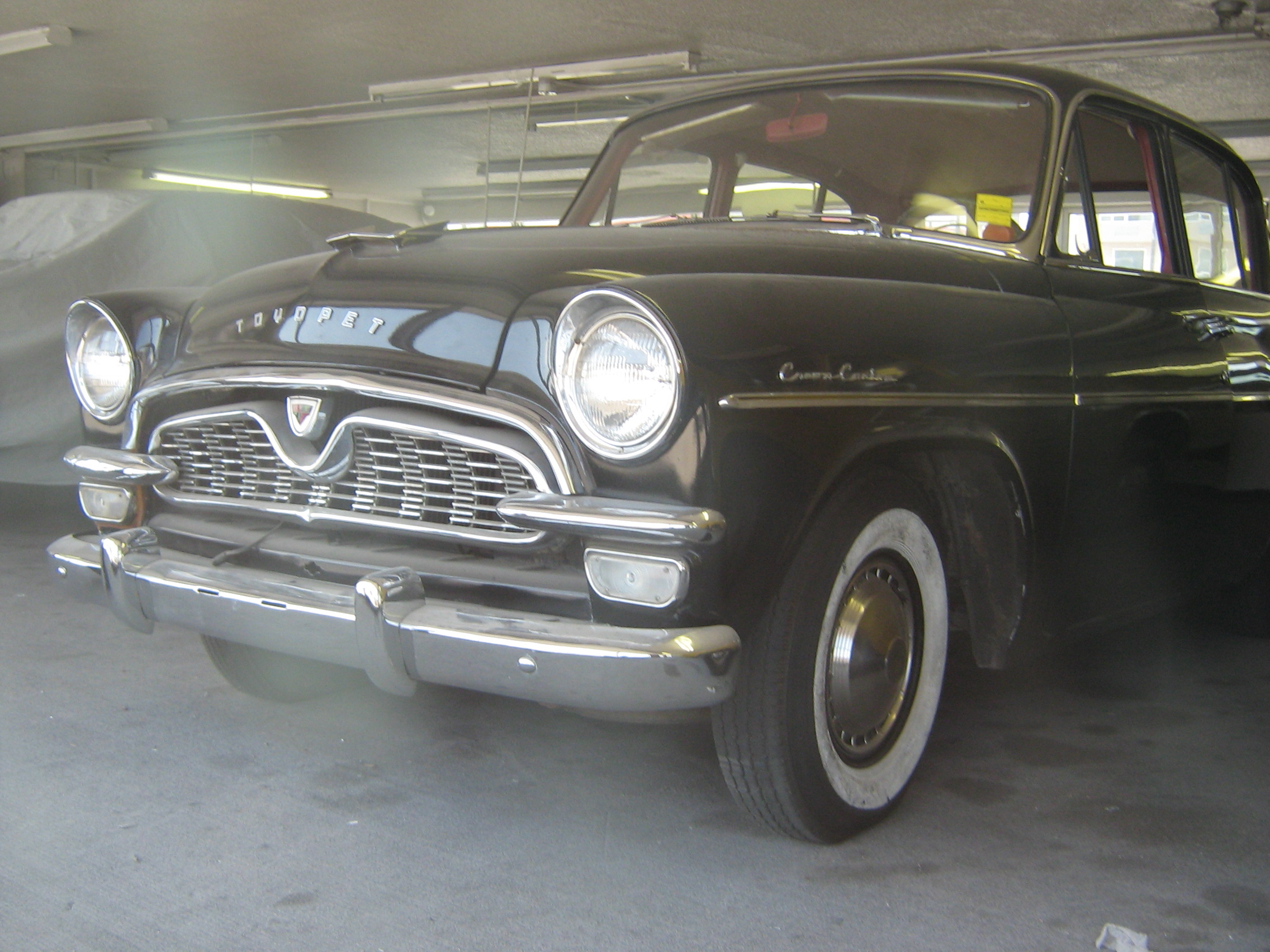
1960 Toyopet Crown

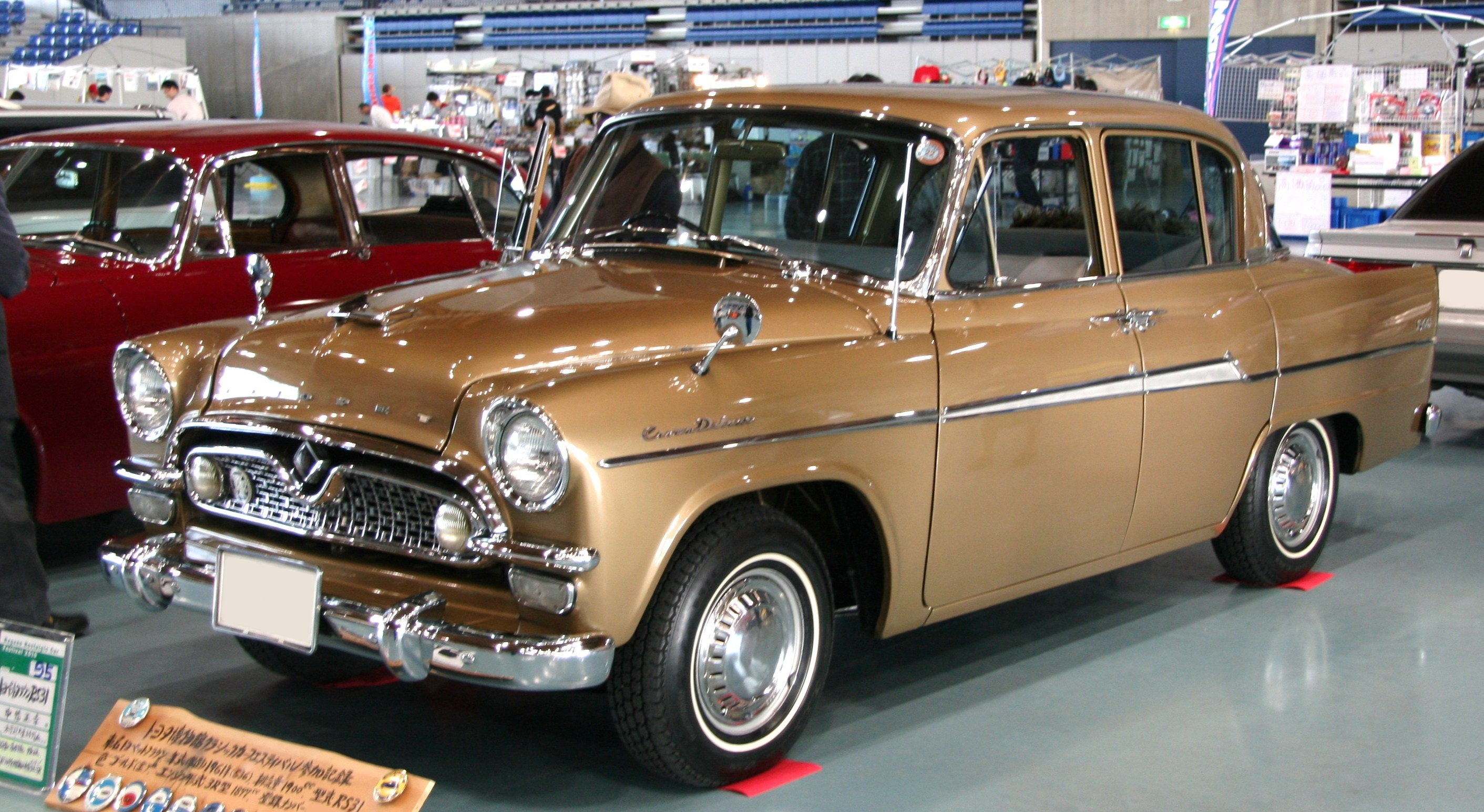
1961 Toyopet Crown (RS31)

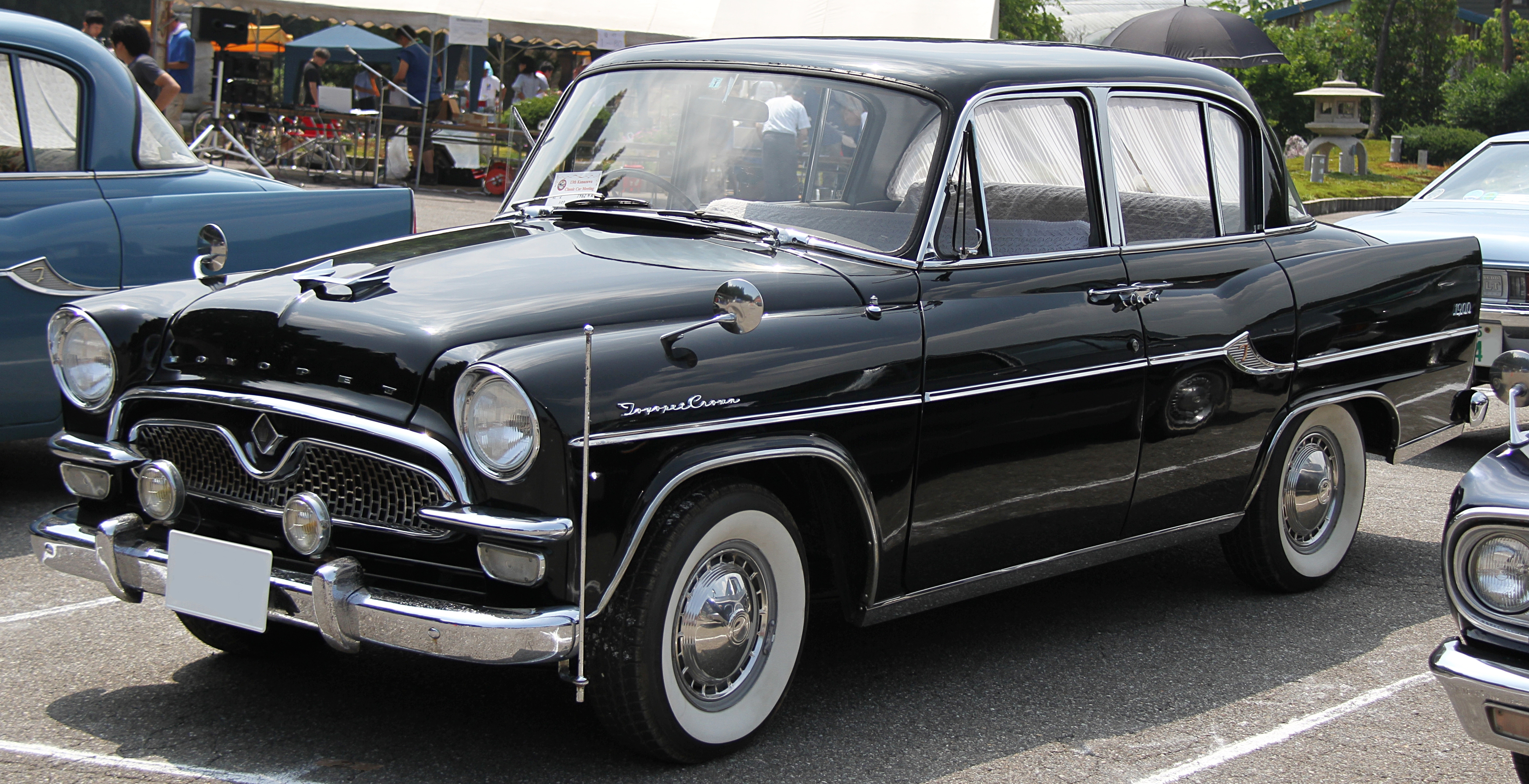
1962 Toyopet Crown

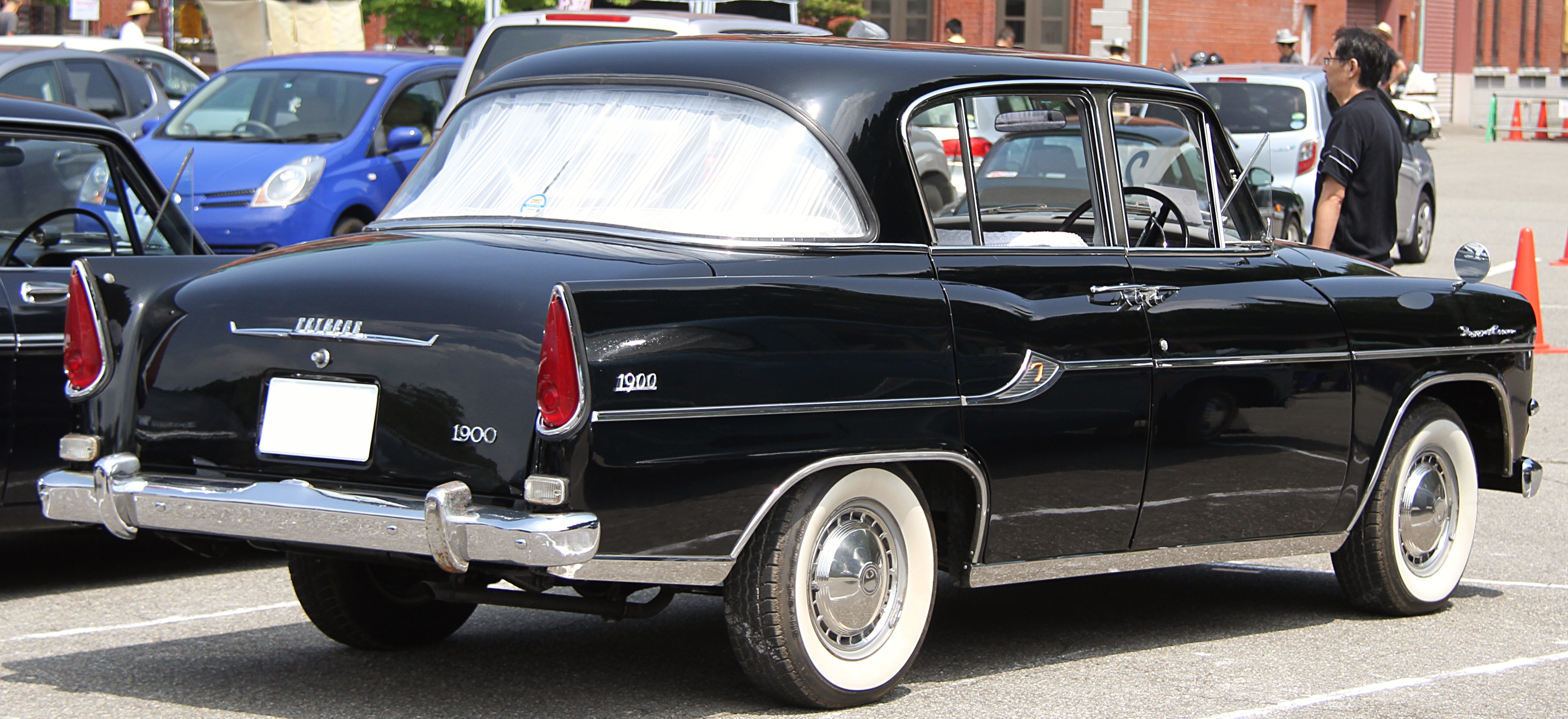
1962 Toyopet Crown (rear view)

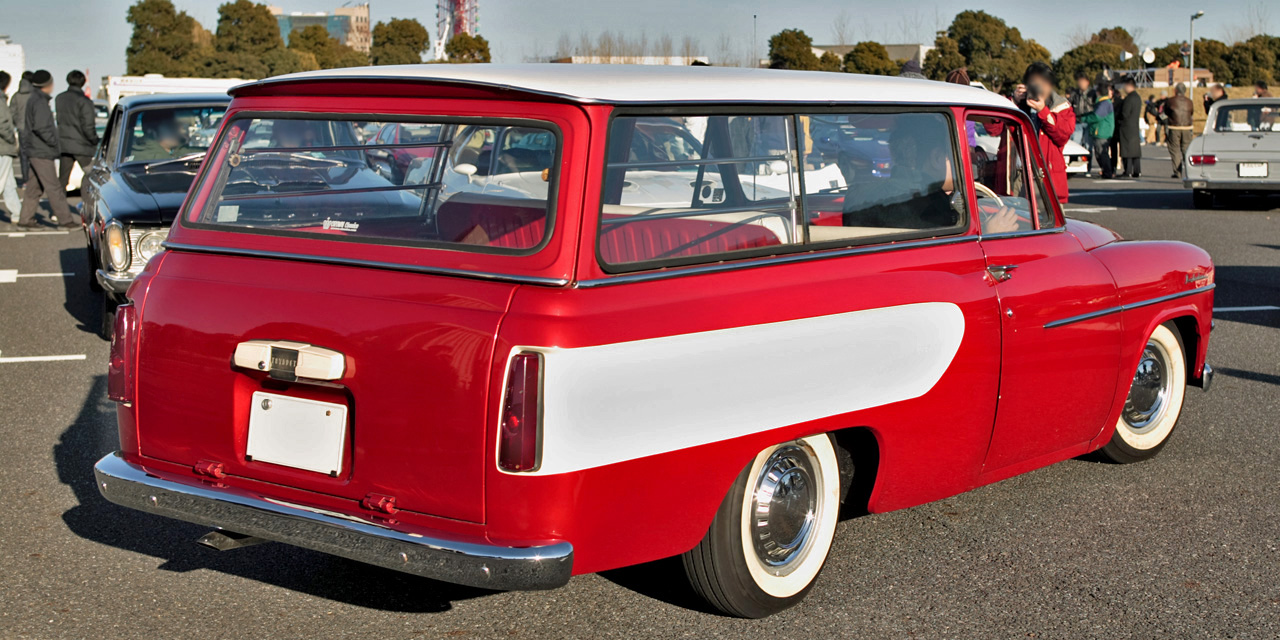
Toyopet Masterline (rear)

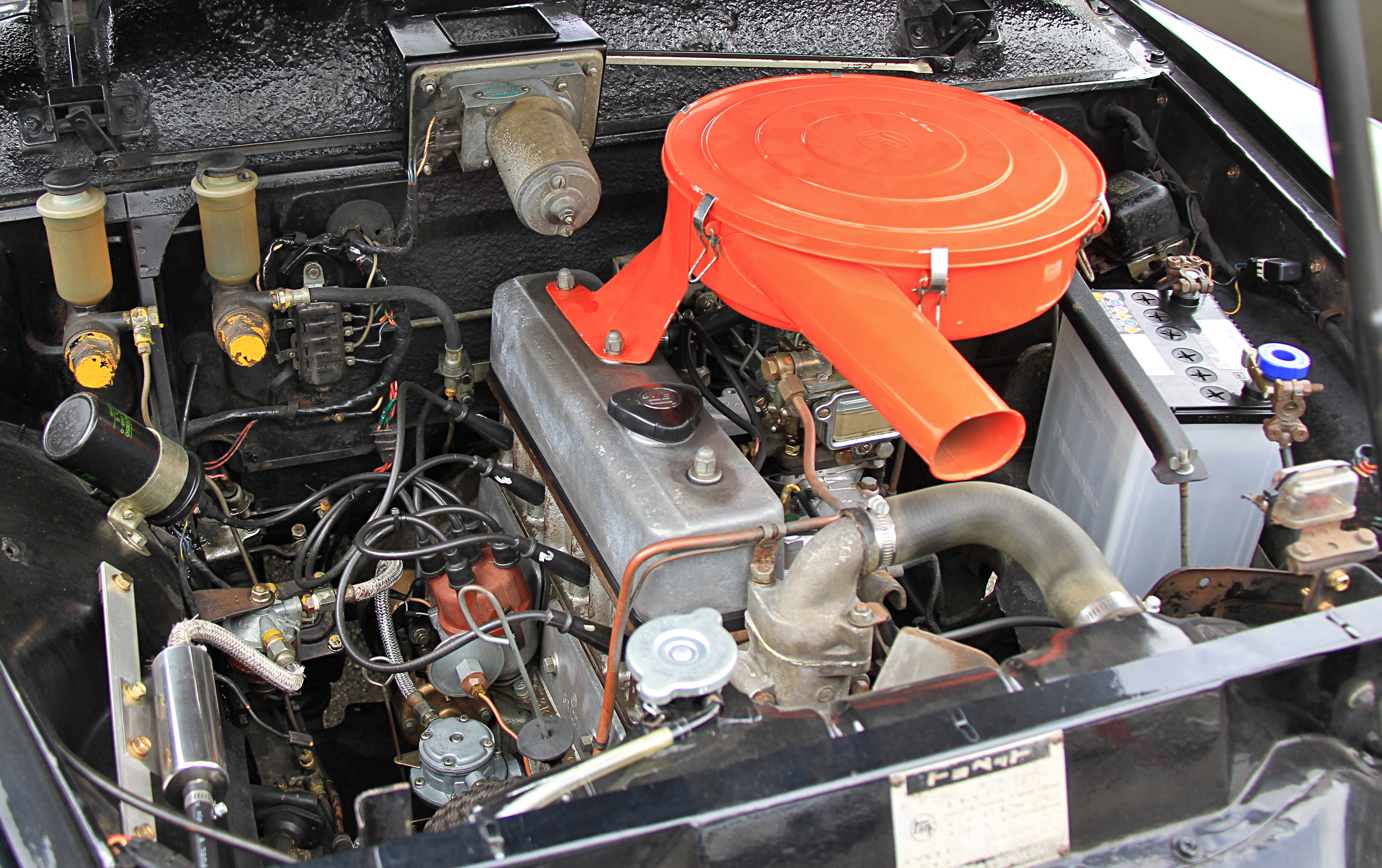
1962 Toyopet Crown 1900 3R I4 (RS30)

== Toyopet Crown – Second generation (S40; 1962) ==
Toyopet Crown – Second generation
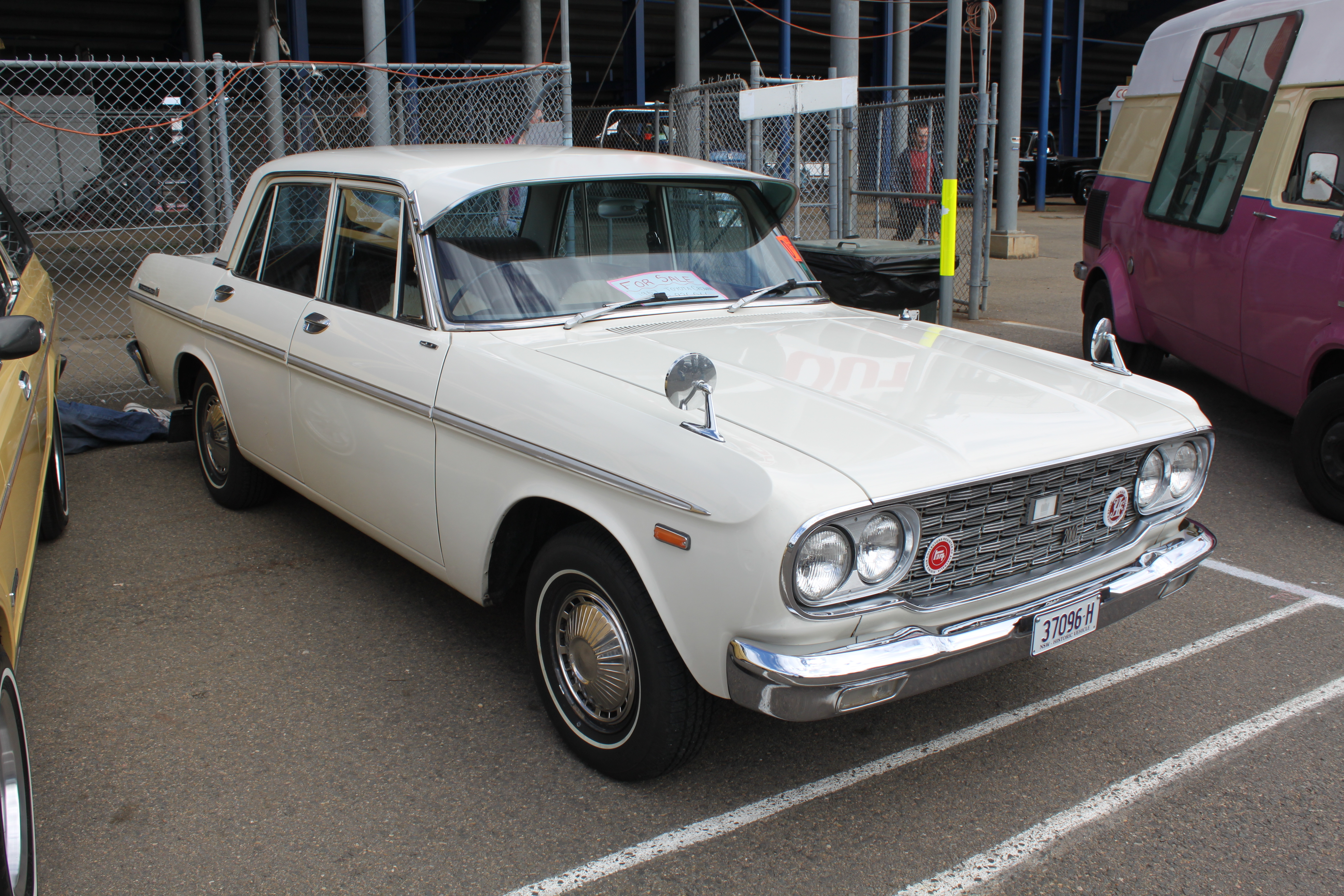
- 1967 Toyota Crown sedan (MS45, Australia)

Overview
- Model code: S40
- Also called: Toyota Crown
- Production: October 1962 – September 1967; February 1967 – unknown (Australia)
- Assembly: Japan: Toyota City (Motomachi plant number 1); Australia: Port Melbourne

Body and chassis
- Body style: 4-door sedan; 4-door station wagon; 2-door coupe utility
- Layout: Front-engine, rear-wheel-drive
- Related: Toyopet Masterline

Powertrain
- Engine: 1.9 L 3R I4; 2.0 L M I6; 2.3 L 2M I6
- Transmission: 3-speed manual; 4-speed manual; 2-speed Toyoglide automatic

Dimensions
- Wheelbase: 2,690 mm (105.9 in)
- Length: 4,610 mm (181.5 in); 4,688 mm (184.6 in) (wagon)
- Width: 1,695 mm (66.7 in); 1,670 mm (65.7 in) (wagon)
- Height: 1,460 mm (57.5 in)
- Curb weight: 1,265 kg (2,789 lb); 1,354 kg (2,985 lb) (wagon)

Due to the introduction of the Corona, the dramatically restyled and enlarged Series S40 was launched in 1962, and saw the introduction of the Custom model. The front grille approach has a similar appearance to the 1960 Imperial Crown (Chrysler), which speaks to Toyota's aspirations that the Crown be a large, comfortable sedan. The station wagon body style carried over from the previous generation Masterline, but with more attention to the luxurious approach used on the Crown.

The stylized "crown" badge, affixed to the grille and hubcaps, first appeared with this generation.

Headlights were integrated within the boundaries of the greatly enlarged grille, providing a clean, modern appearance. A column-shifted 2-speed automatic transmission called Toyoglide was introduced on this generation. A bigger and better car than the previous S30 series, it initially had four-cylinder R-series engines before the addition of the "M" six-cylinder engine in 1965. Deluxe and Super Deluxe models were available with added features. The ladder frame chassis of the previous generation was replaced with an X-frame to achieve a lower centre of gravity. The sedan and wagon were known simply as the Crown while the commercial vehicles (coupe utility, double cab coupe utility (pick ups), and van) were known as the Masterline. There was also a limited run of the sedan known as the Toyota Crown S (MS41S) which featured twin SU style carburettors on the 2.0L M in-line-six engine, sportier camshaft, sports instrumentation, sports suspension, four-speed floor shift, bucket seats, 14 inch wheels, disc brakes on the front and larger drum brakes in the rear.

This Crown became the first Toyota to be exported to Europe, after the head of Denmark's Erla Auto Import A/S saw it at the Tokyo Motor Show. They brought in 190 of these subsequent to a May 1963 agreement. In Canada, it was introduced in November 1964 as one of the first Toyota models available in the country alongside the UP10 Publica. In the US, the MS41L sedan was available in the US for US$2,305 (equivalent to about $24,533 in 2025) PoE while the MS46LG station wagon was available for US$2,525 (equivalent to about $26,875 in 2025) PoE. Some optional features include the Toyoglide automatic transmission for US$160 (equivalent to about $1,703 in 2025) and a radio for US$60 (equivalent to about $639 in 2025).

A two-door Crown Convertible was displayed at the 1963 Tokyo Motor Show, based on the Crown 1900 sedan. It was not put into production.

This Crown generation was the first to be assembled in Australia, from CKD kits, by AMI in Port Melbourne, with significant local content. AMI, which assembled numerous brands including Triumph and, for a short time, Mercedes-Benz, was to become the basis of Toyota's Australian manufacturing operation.

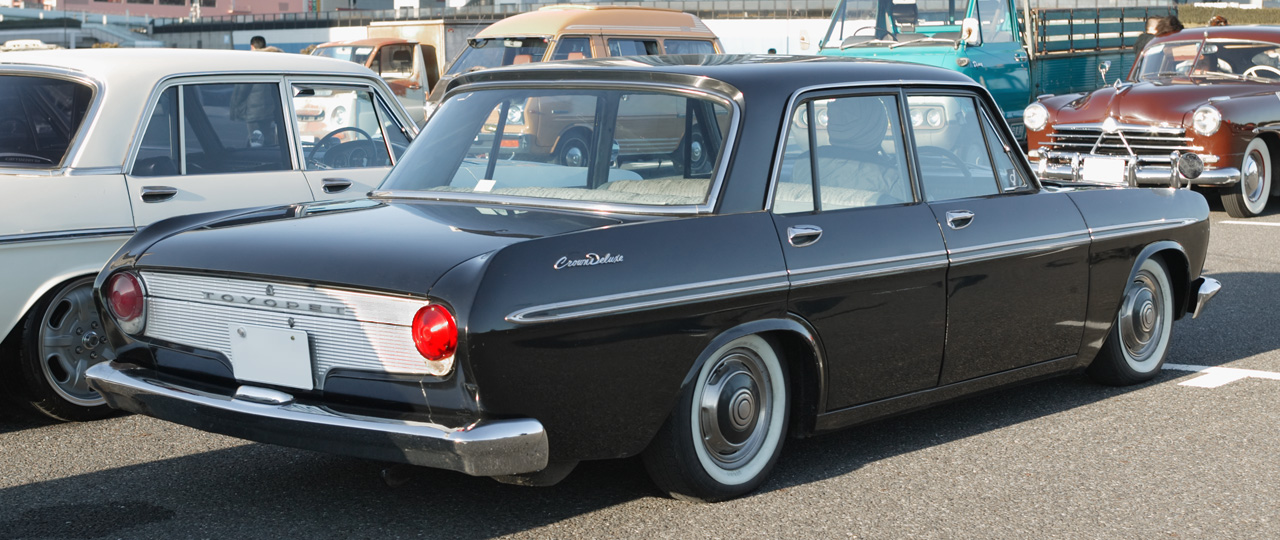
S40 Toyopet Crown Sedan

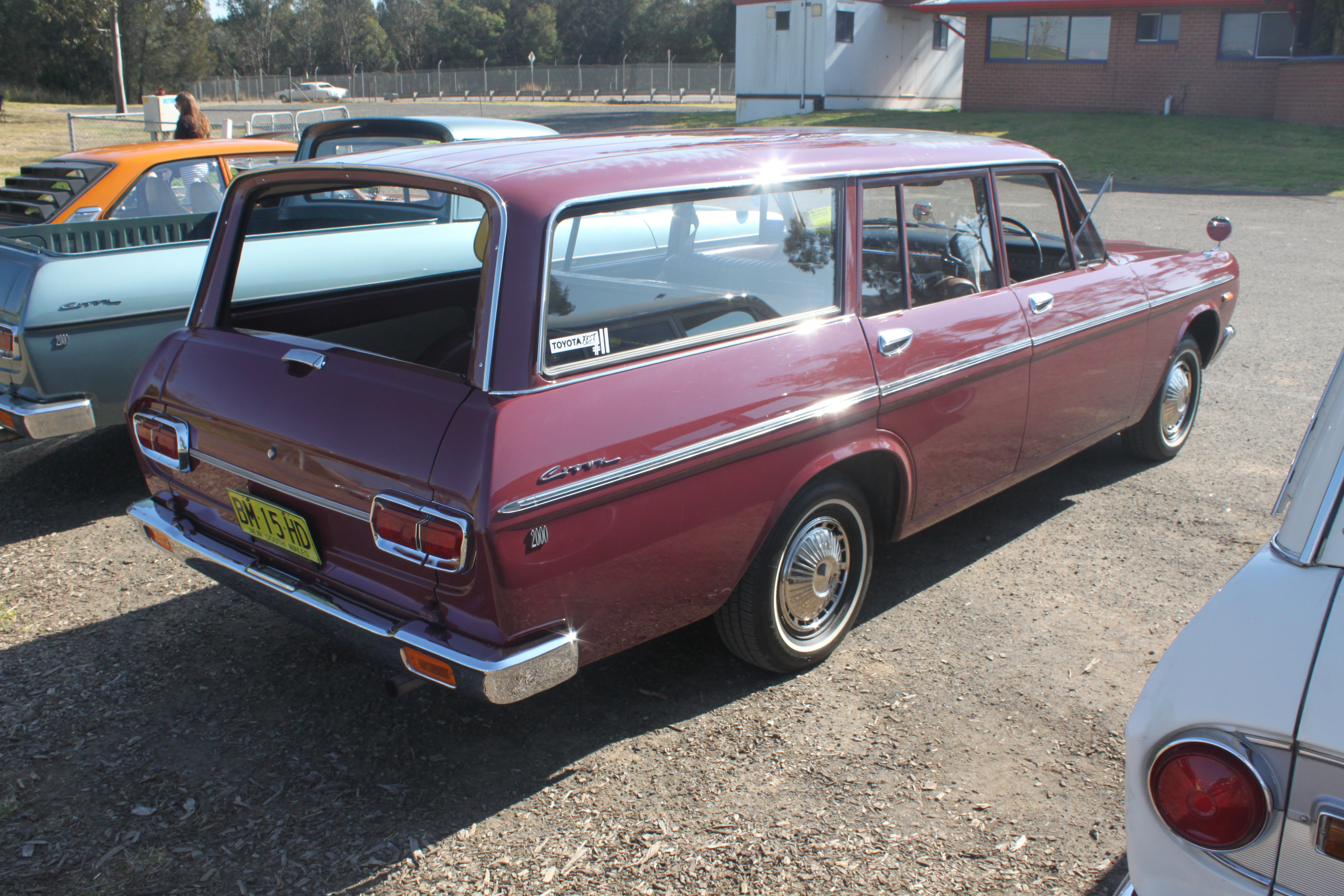
S40 Toyopet Crown Wagon

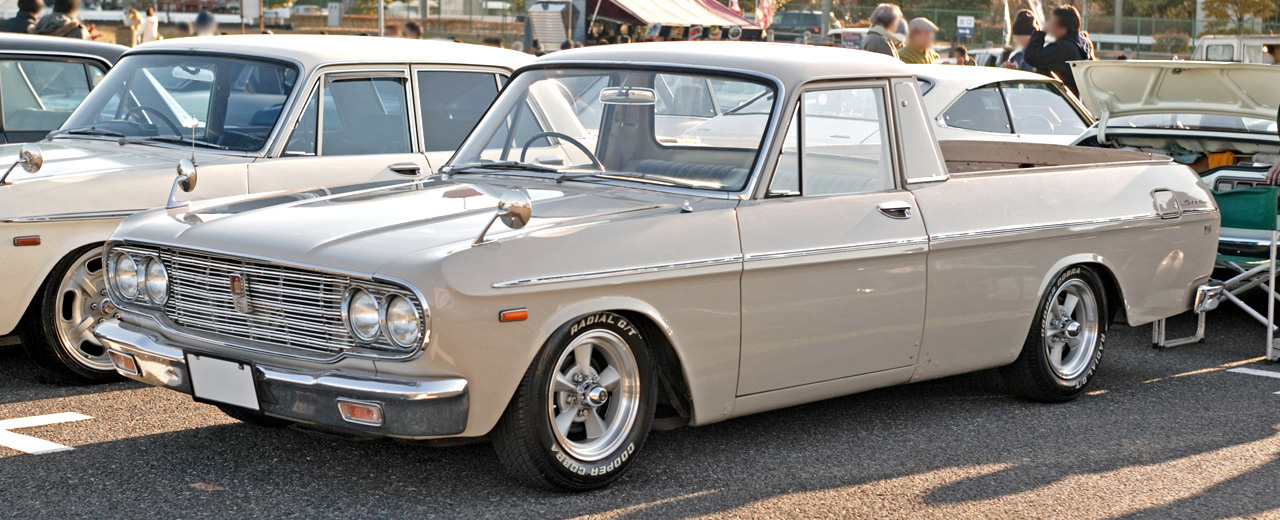
Toyopet Masterline coupe utility (pick up)

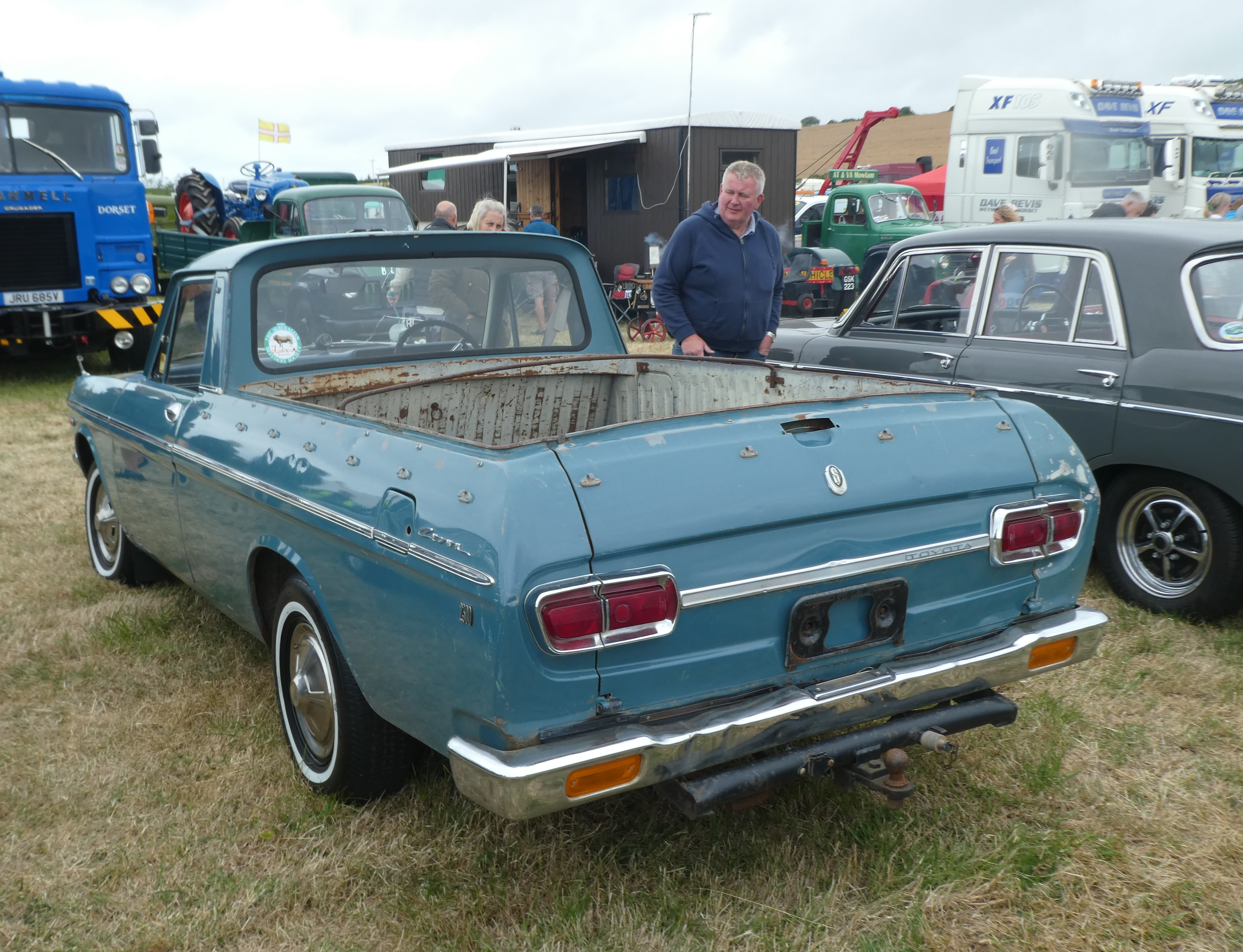
Toyota Crown 2300 Masterline Pick-up (MS47)

=== Crown Eight (G10) ===
Toyota Crown Eight
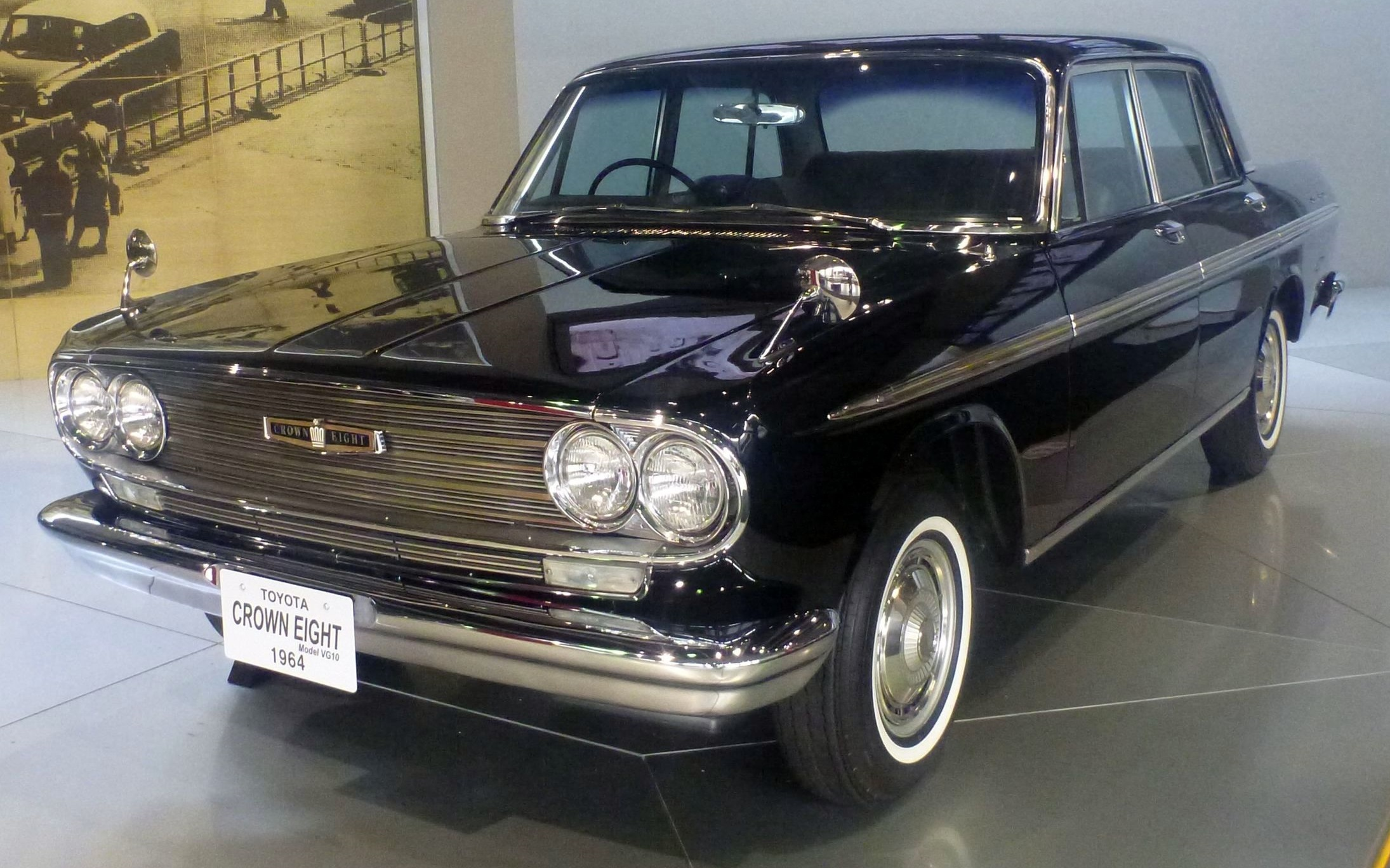

Overview
- Model code: G10; VG10
- Production: April 1964 – July 1967
- Assembly: Japan: Yokosuka (Kanto Auto Works)

Body and chassis
- Class: Full-size luxury car (F)
- Body style: 4-door sedan
- Layout: Front-engine, rear-wheel-drive

Powertrain
- Engine: 2.6L (2599cc) V V8
- Transmission: 3-speed manual; 2-speed Toyoglide A20 automatic

Dimensions
- Wheelbase: 2,740 mm (108 in)
- Length: 4,720 mm (186 in)
- Width: 1,845 mm (72.6 in)
- Height: 1,460 mm (57 in)
- Curb weight: 1,375 kg (3,031 lb)

Chronology
- Successor: Toyota Century

The longer, wider, and more upmarket Crown Eight was introduced in 1964 for the Japanese market, powered by a 2.6 L V8 engine. However, it had a different model designation, G10 (VG10 when fitted by 2.6 L V engine). The car was first introduced at the 1963 Tokyo Motor Show and introduced for sale on April 20, 1964, nine days before Emperor Showa's birthday and the beginning of Golden Week in Japan. While it was essentially a wider S40 Crown, it was branded as a "Toyota" and not "Toyopet".

The Toyota Crown Eight was a significant project for Toyota, developed and assembled by their subcontracting company, Kanto Auto Works. Toyota delegated the production to Kanto Auto Works due to the Crown Eight's unique components, which could have hindered mass-production operations at the Motomachi plant. Despite its production volume of approximately 1,000 cars per year, the Crown Eight's impact on Toyota products paved the way for future innovations and designs.

The Crown Eight was designed to replace full-sized American automobiles commonly used by major corporations. The Crown Eight represents the first Japanese mass-produced vehicle with an 8-cylinder engine. The main rivals at the time were the Prince Grand Gloria, Mitsubishi Debonair, and Nissan Cedric Special, all equipped with a six-cylinder engine. It was the first Crown to exceed vehicle size classification regulations in length, width, and engine displacement capacity. The width at 1,845 mm (72.6 in) compares to the Century at 1,890 mm (74 in). The width was so that the front and rear bench seats, upholstered in silk brocade, could accommodate six passengers. The front seat could be electrically adjusted in six directions, and the front seatback could be reclined horizontally to be flat to the rear seat, while the rear seat included a center folding armrest.

The Crown Eight was considered as a possible submission for use by the Japanese Imperial Household Agency as a car to be used by senior members of the Imperial House of Japan, but it lost out to the Nissan Prince Royal. The Crown Eight was replaced in 1967 by the Century VG20. Approx 3,800 Crown Eights were produced. Some of the items that were exclusive to the Crown Eight were climate control, automatic headlamps, electrically powered windows, electric cruise control, and a two-speed "Toyoglide" automatic transmission. Vent windows were installed on all doors, separate from the side windows, and could be opened or closed electrically. The front and rear door latches were electromagnetic and installed on the Crown Eight successor, the Century. Unlike a conventional door handle, the door latch would release by touching the interior switch. The front suspension used a double wishbone suspension with coil springs and the rear used a trailing arm suspension with coil springs, with shock absorbers for all wheels. The Crown Eight was available in four exterior colors: Royal Bronze Metallic, Sherwood Olive Metallic, Black, and Victoria Blue Metallic.

== Toyopet Crown – Third generation (S50; 1967) ==
Toyopet Crown – Third generation
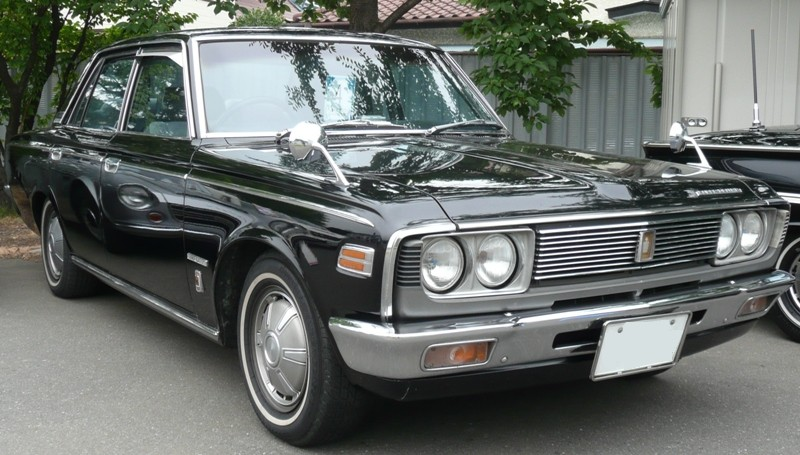
- 1969 Toyota Crown Super Deluxe (S50, Japan)

Overview
- Model code: S50
- Also called: Toyota Crown; Toyota Ambulance (ambulance variant)
- Production: September 1967 – February 1971
- Assembly: Japan; Australia: Port Melbourne (AMI)

Body and chassis
- Body style: 4-door sedan; 4-door station wagon; 2-door coupé; 2/4-door coupé utility
- Layout: Front-engine, rear-wheel-drive

Powertrain
- Engine: 1,994 cc 5R I4; 1,988 cc M I6; 2,253 cc 2M I6
- Transmission: 3-speed manual (optional O/D); 4-speed manual; 2-speed automatic; 3-speed automatic

Dimensions
- Wheelbase: 2,690 mm (105.9 in)
- Length: 4,665 mm (183.7 in) sedan; 4,585 mm (180.5 in) hardtop; 4,690 mm (184.6 in) wagon
- Width: 1,690 mm (66.5 in)
- Height: 1,445 mm (56.9 in) sedan; 1,465 mm (57.7 in) wagon
- Curb weight: 1,305–1,410 kg (2,877–3,109 lb)

Chronology
- Predecessor: Toyota Masterline (for commercial use versions)

Launched in 1967, the mechanicals were much the same as the previous generation, but additional equipment was included. The X-frame chassis of the S40 series was now dropped in favour of a perimeter frame that improved collision protection for passengers; this chassis design would remain in use until 1999 when the S130-series wagons were superseded by the unibody S170-series Estates. Higher specification models used the 2.0-liter M engine or the 2.3-liter 2M engine shared with the Toyota 2000GT sports coupe. A premium level Super Saloon joined the Super Deluxe model, and was available with the 2M engine including twin carburettors, electric windows, rear seat radio controls, air conditioning and luxury fabric on the seating including the Crown logo embossed into the vinyl. Lower specified models were equipped with the R-series four-cylinder engines. Crown vehicles meant for commercial use had received the Masterline nameplate until the introduction of this generation; they were now badged "Crown" as well. However, this generation was the last to be offered in an entire line of commercials - from the next generation on, the only commercial-use model available was the Crown Van, whose bodywork was also used for the Wagon models. Crown Double-Cab pickups were produced by the former Central Motor Co., Ltd. until December 1970.

When the 1967 S50 series Crown was introduced to Japan, television commercials used Japanese actor Satoshi Yamamura, who among his many roles on stage, movie, and television, portrayed Fleet Admiral Isoroku Yamamoto in the 1970s movie Tora! Tora! Tora! Yamamura would serve as the Crown spokesman for 16 years, introducing subsequent new generations of Crown products until 1983.

The Crown range now included the four-door station wagon, pick-up (rare), double cab pick-up (very rare), and in October 1968, the new two-door hardtop "personal luxury car."

In September 1968 the option of power steering was added. In 1969 the Crown received a facelift for the headlight, grille and trim arrangement. The Crown S used the two-liter 'six', but due to sportier tuning it produced more power than the larger 2M, 125 PS (92 kW) at 5,800 rpm versus 115 PS (85 kW) at 5,200 rpm. The commercial versions were fitted with the six-cylinder "M" engine (M-C) produce 105 PS (77 kW), while the four-cylinder 5R had to make do with 93 PS (68 kW). This generation was the only one to use a double-hinged tailgate, as the next generation converted to an overhead-lifting hatchback door.

Crowns that were equipped with the 2,253 cc 2M engine were no longer classified as compact cars under Japanese vehicle size classification regulations, even though the length and width were still in compliance. Toyota offered the larger engine so that buyers who were traditionally served by the Crown could now choose the all-new Corona Mark II in 1968. This allowed Toyota to reposition the Crown as the top level privately available luxury sedan, with much nicer interior treatments, more spacious accommodations. This was the last generation for the pick-up versions of the Crown, as load carrying was ceded to the new Toyota Hilux in February 1971.

Australian market models were assembled in Australia by Australian Motor Industries. The two-door ute was also assembled in Australia, but not the coupé model. This generation was imported fully assembled into New Zealand from 1968 to 1971.

This generation was still sold in the United States; 1970 was the most successful year for the nameplate in the US with 6,528 being sold.

Notable features on the Crown Wagon were:

- 7- or 8-passenger seating (two on front buckets or three on a bench seat, three on a rear bench seat, and two on a fold up cargo seat),
- a powered rear window,
- a side-swing tailgate.
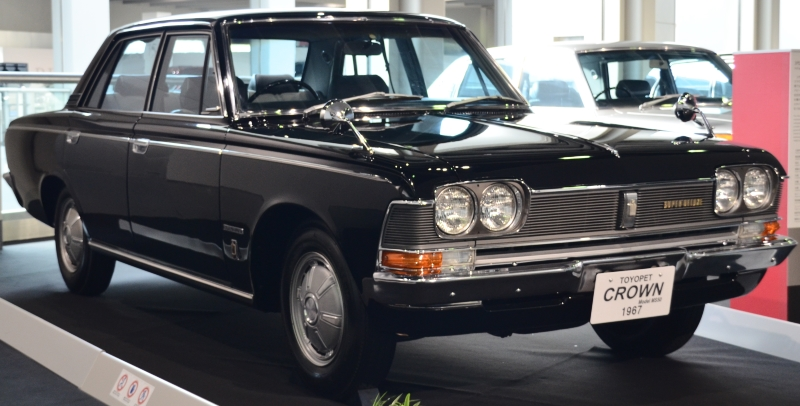
1967 Pre-facelift Crown Super Deluxe

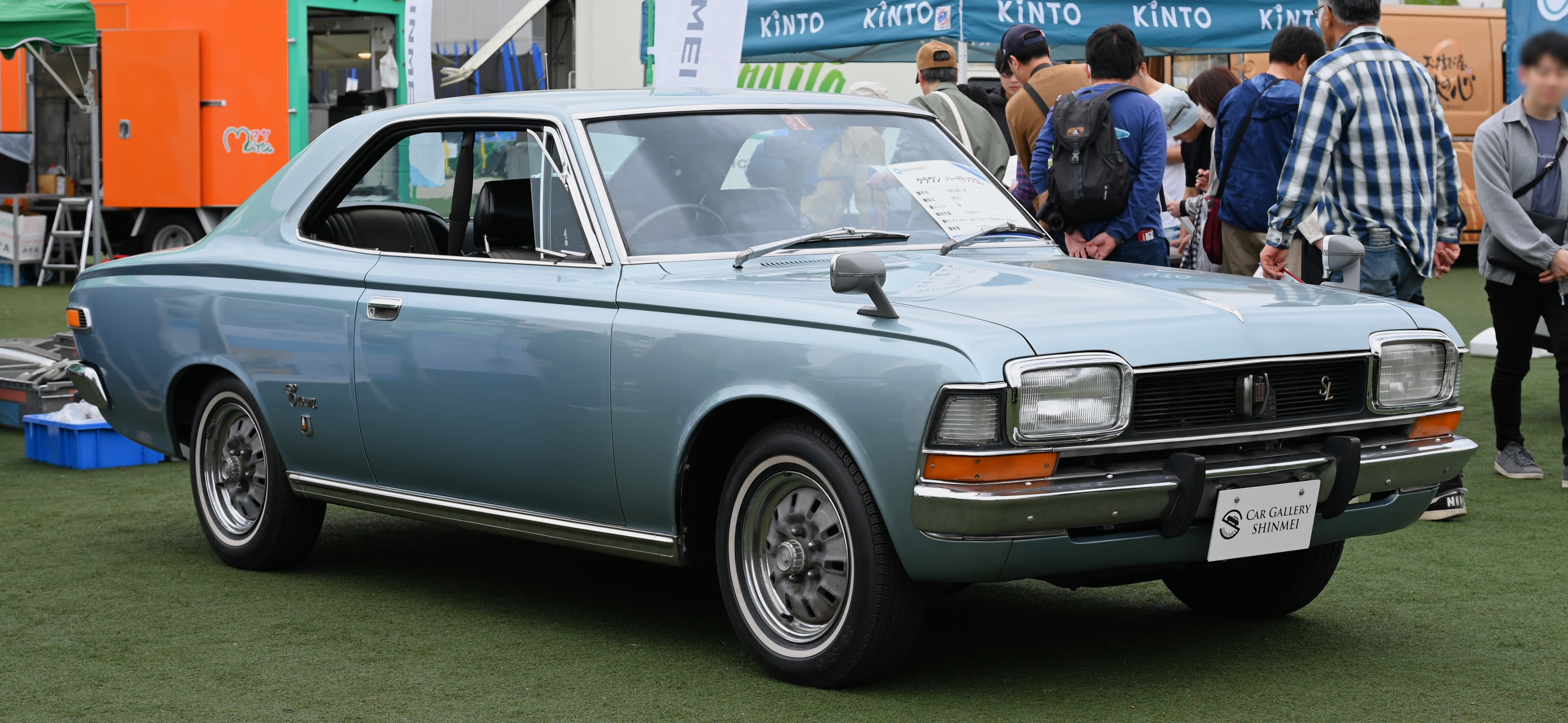
1968 Pre-facelift Crown Hardtop SL

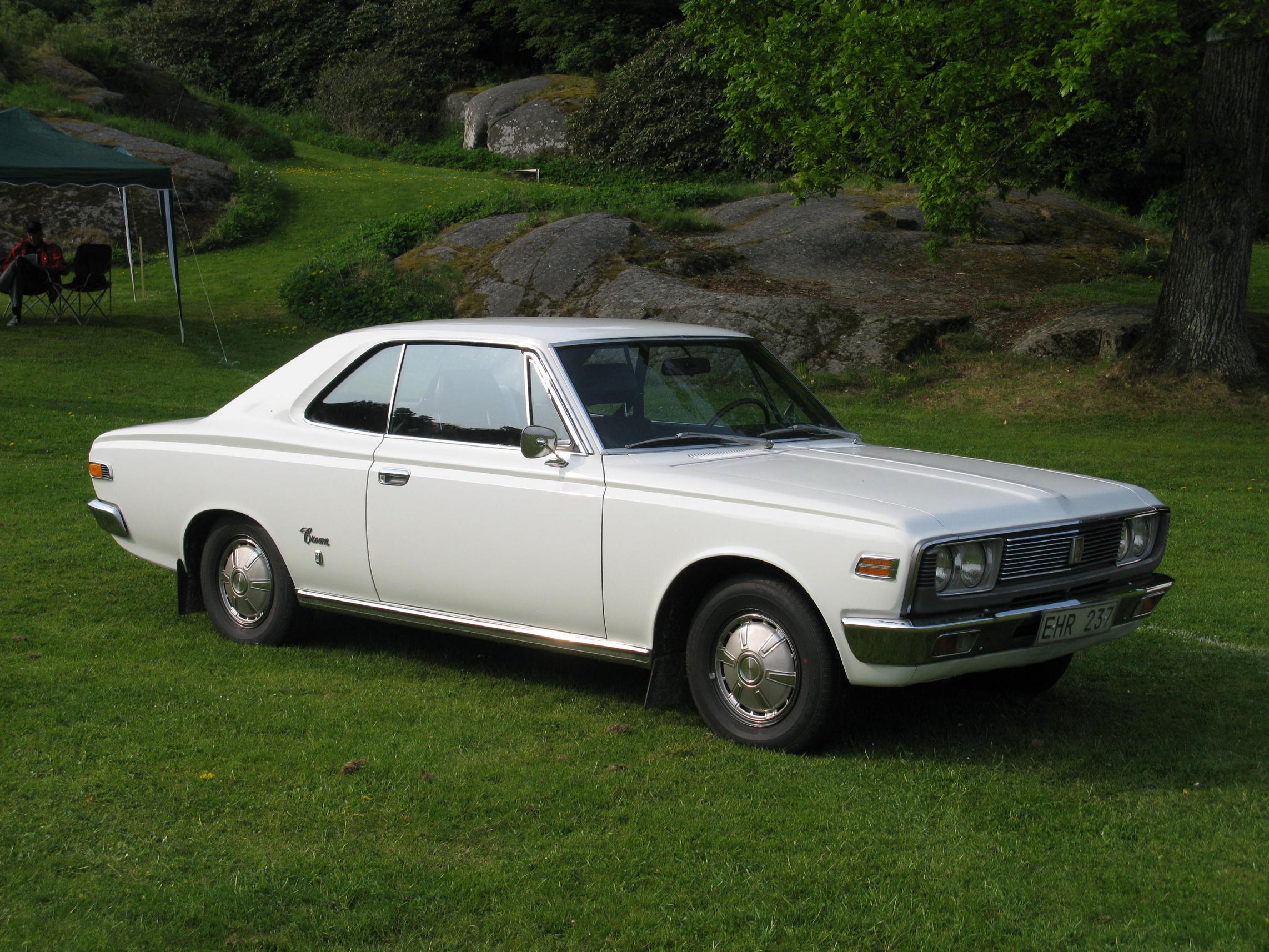
1970 Facelift Crown S50 Hardtop

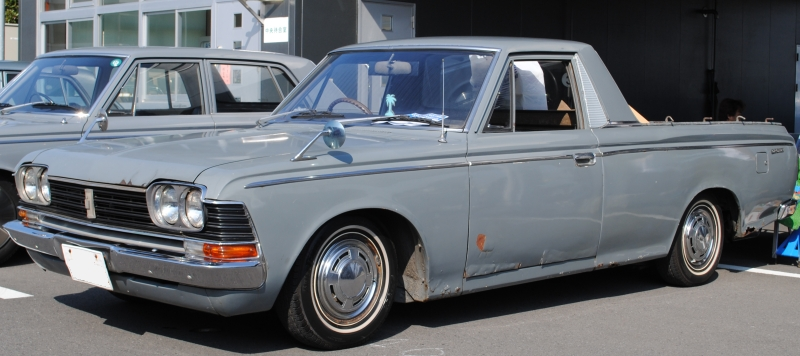
Crown S50 Utility Pick-up

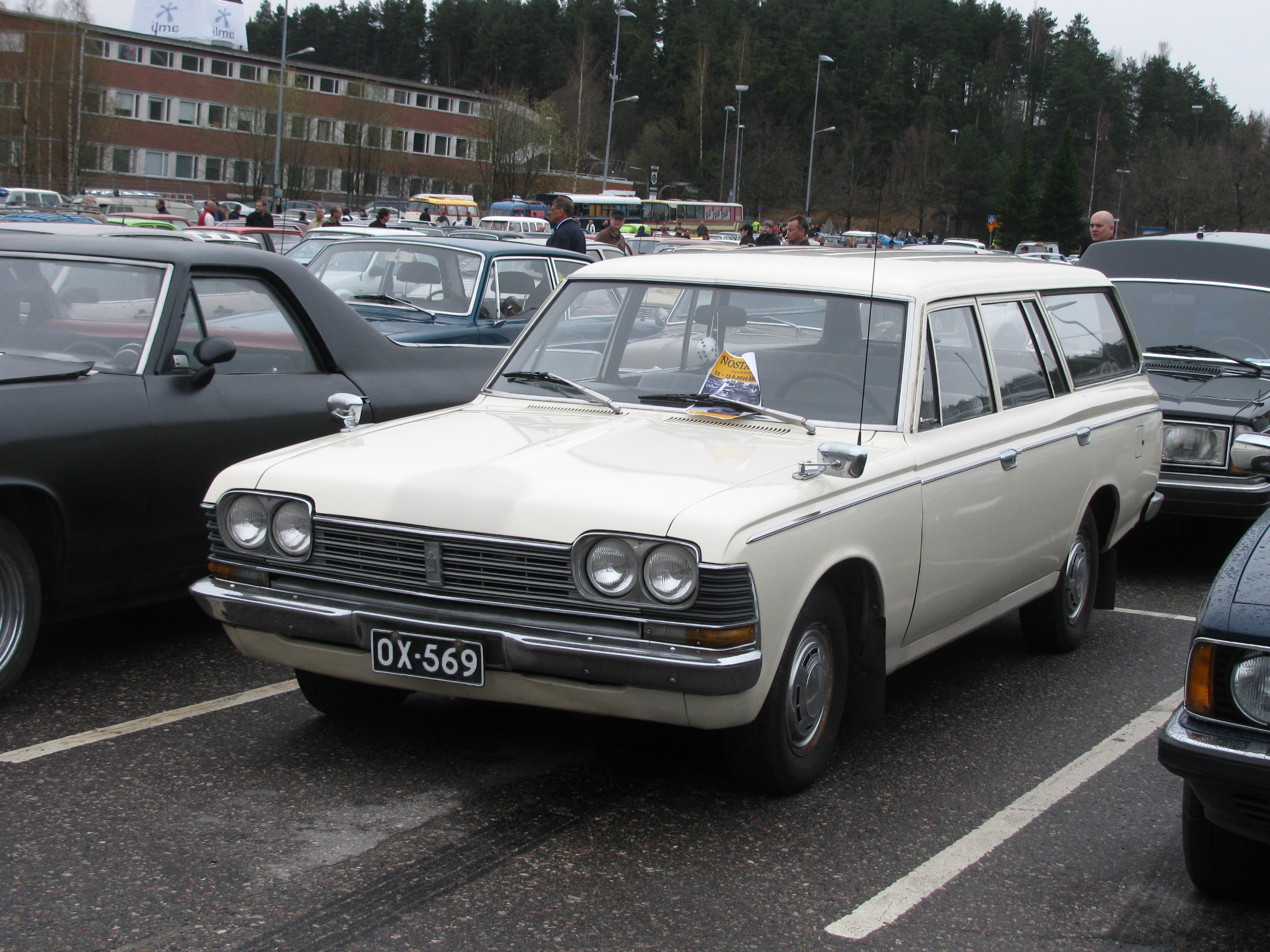
Crown S50 Station Wagon

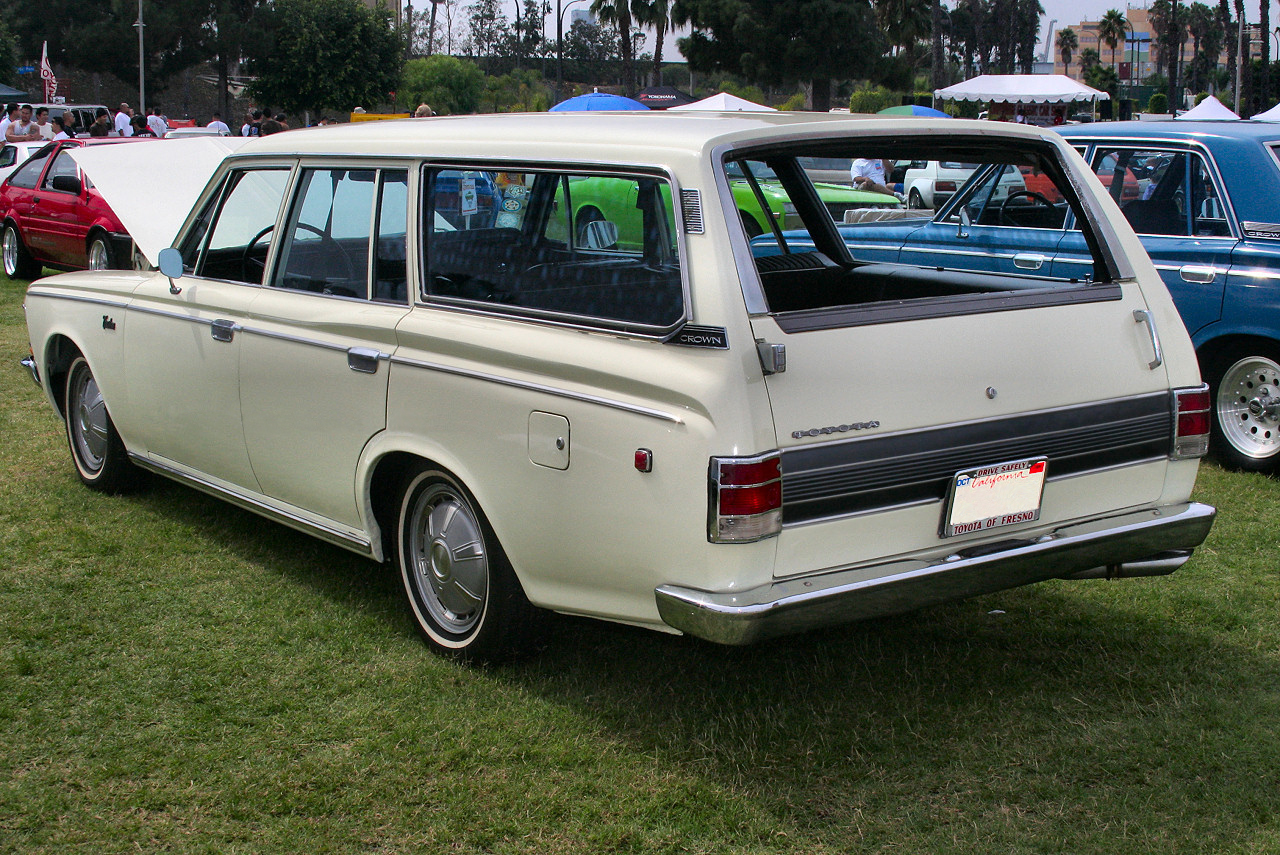
1969 Crown Custom Wagon, showing side hinged tailgate

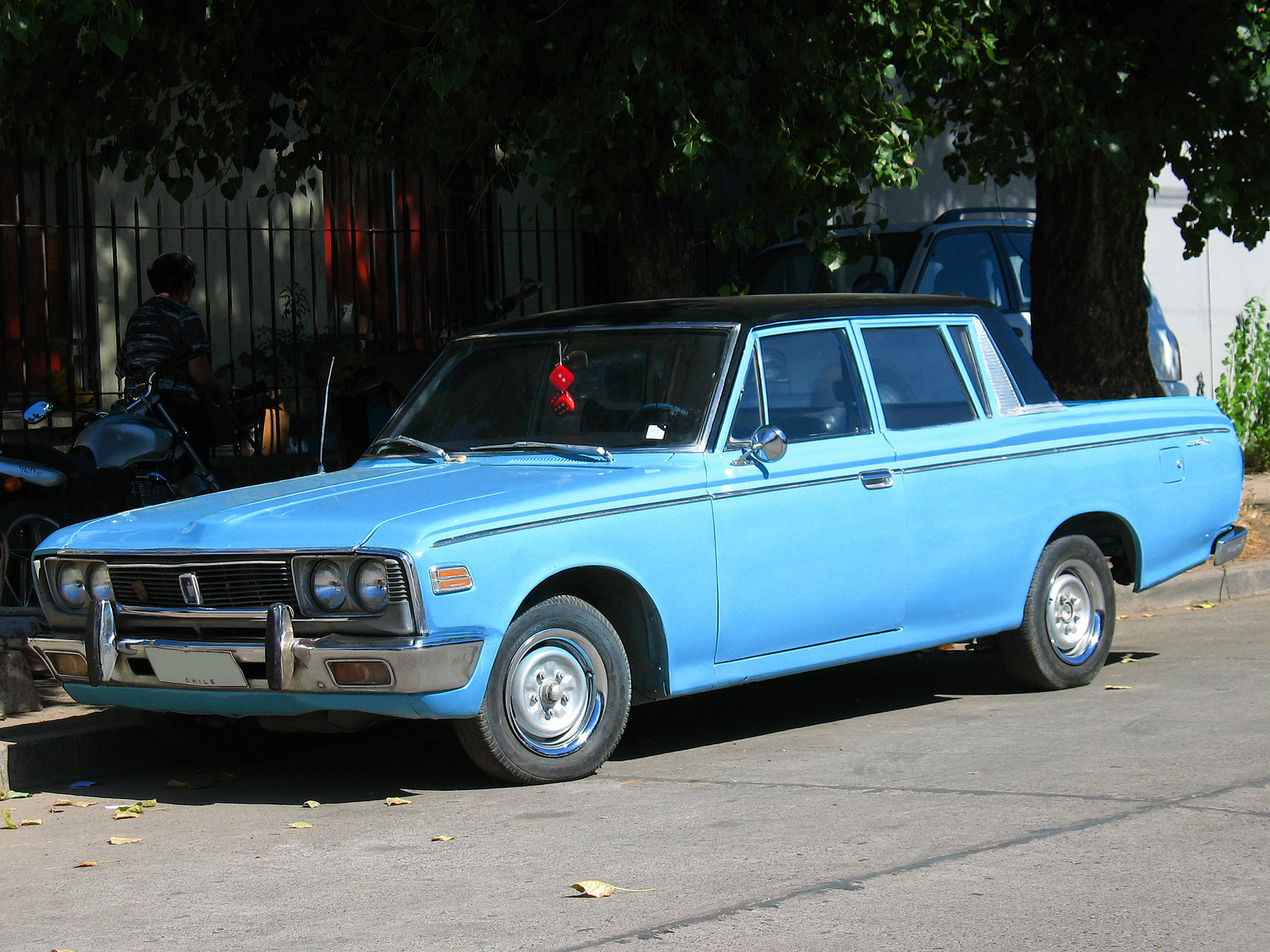
1969 Crown Double Cabin

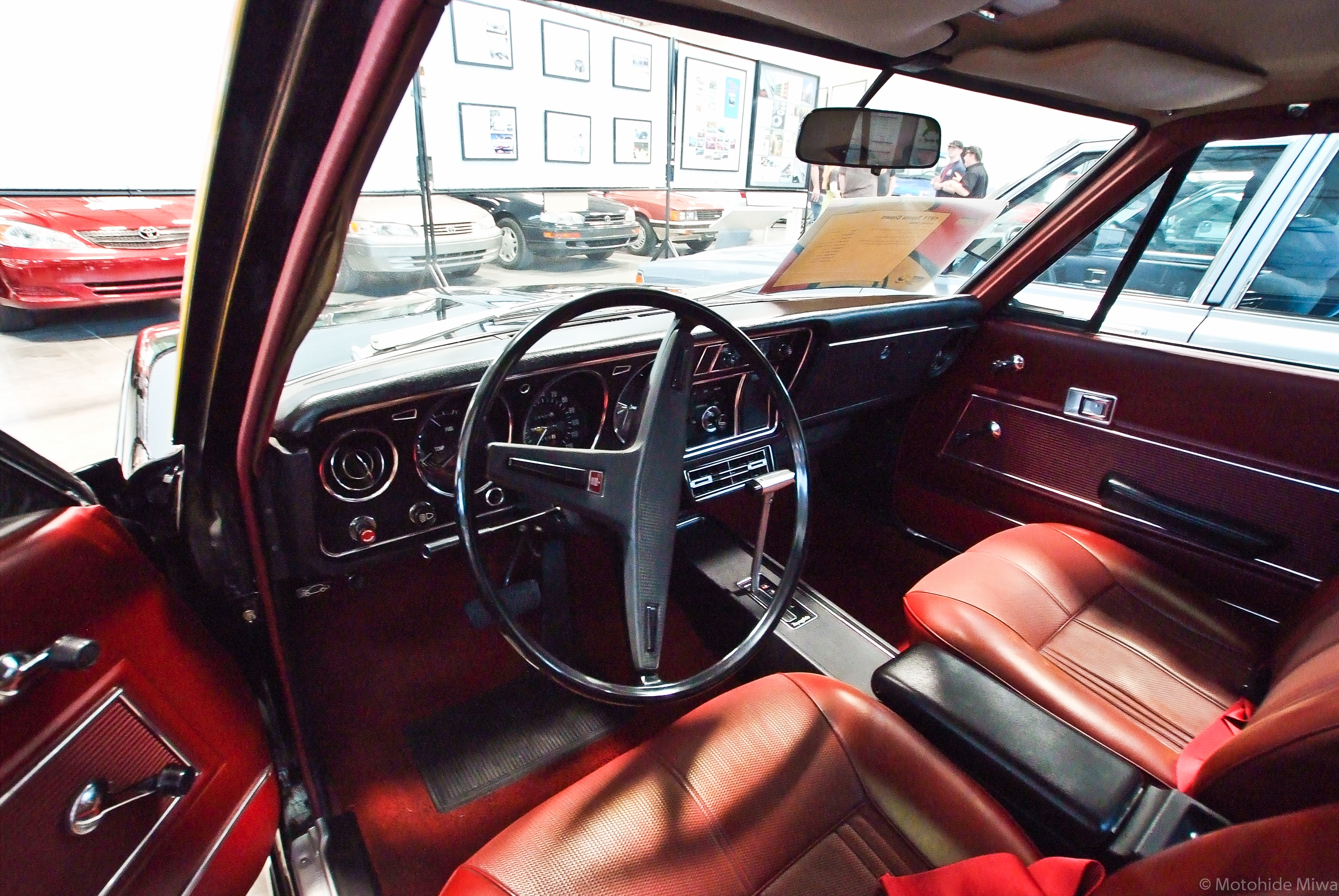
Toyota Crown Super Saloon interior

== Fourth generation (S60/S70; 1971) ==
Fourth generation
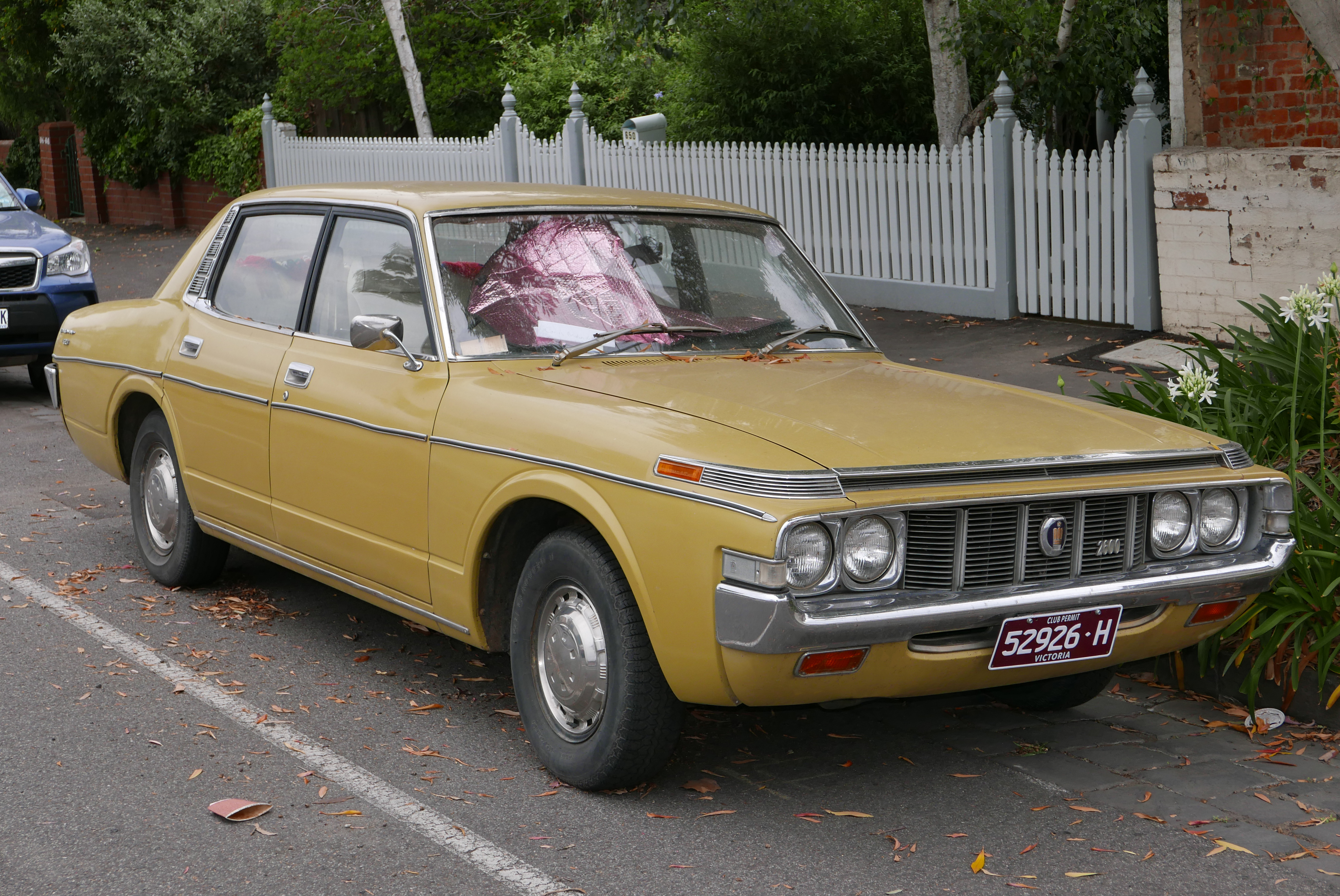
- 1973–1975 Toyota Crown SE sedan (MS65, Australia)

Overview
- Model code: S60; S70
- Production: February 1971 – September 1974
- Assembly: Japan; Australia; New Zealand

Body and chassis
- Body style: 4-door sedan; 5-door station wagon/van; 2-door hardtop
- Layout: Front-engine, rear-wheel-drive

Powertrain
- Engine: 1994 cc 5R I4 (RS60/66V); 1988 cc M I6 (MS60/62/66V/70); 2253 cc 2M I6 (MS64/67V); 2563 cc 4M I6 (MS65/68V/75)
- Transmission: 3/4/5-speed manual; 3-speed automatic

Dimensions
- Wheelbase: 2,690 mm (105.9 in)
- Length: 4,680 mm (184.3 in)
- Width: 1,690 mm (66.5 in)
- Height: 1,420 mm (55.9 in)
- Curb weight: 1,290–1,360 kg (2,844–2,998 lb)

Launched in February 1971 for the Japanese Domestic Market, the fourth generation Crown was available in ascending trim levels, including Deluxe, Super Deluxe and Super Saloon. Another trim, Royal Saloon, introduced with the Crown's 1973 facelift, added luxury features from the Century limousine. The first two model years of the fourth generation Crown were marketed in North America; subsequently replaced by the Corona Mark II.

The 4M 2600 engine was introduced, with the 2.0-liter 5R inline-four engine and the 2.0-liter M six-cylinder engine also available. As for the previous generation, the M-C engine (in Japanese specifications) has 105 PS (77 kW; 104 bhp), while the 5R's output increased somewhat to 98 PS (72 kW; 97 bhp). In some markets the previous 2.3-liter "2M" six remained available, in sedan or "utility wagon" forms.

The Utility Wagon was a body style between commercial and passenger car, and carried chassis codes MS67V until the early 1973 facelift when it was replaced by the MS68V with the 2.6 engine.

While previous generations of the Crown had been marketed under the Toyopet brand, the fourth-generation model was the first version to be officially marketed worldwide as the Toyota Crown.

The Sedan and Wagon (Custom) were coded RS60/MS60/MS64/MS65 and MS62/MS63, while the Van was coded MS66V with the two liter "six". The Hardtop Coupé is MS70 (2.0-liter), or MS75 (2.6-liter). The Japanese market Crown Custom (Wagon) was classified as a seven-seater. This generation was the first Crown marketed as a Toyota in Japan, as previous models were marketed as Toyopets. Also, in Japan, this model was known as the "whale" or "kujira" Crown.

In 1973, Japanese television commercials introduced Japanese actress Sayuri Yoshinaga as a co-spokeswoman, joining Satoshi Yamamura, and together they appeared in commercials until 1983.

Crown's for the Japanese Domestic Market Hardtop featured rectangular halogen headlights, and export models featured twin round headlights. All models featured flush bumpers, marketed by Toyota as "spindle-shaped."

The trunk could be opened remotely by turning the ignition key to the far left, and a floor-mounted button engaged the radio's signal seeking feature. A separate signal seeking feature was installed for rear seat passengers, installed behind the front seat facing the rear seat compartment. The 60-series Crown received a facelift in January 1973.

Australian models were assembled in Australia by AMI. It was available in New Zealand fully imported from 1971 to 1973, with local assembly beginning at Steels Motor Assemblies, who also built the Corona, not long before the mid-life facelift, improving availability. Steels subsequently became Toyota NZ's Christchurch CKD assembly plant.

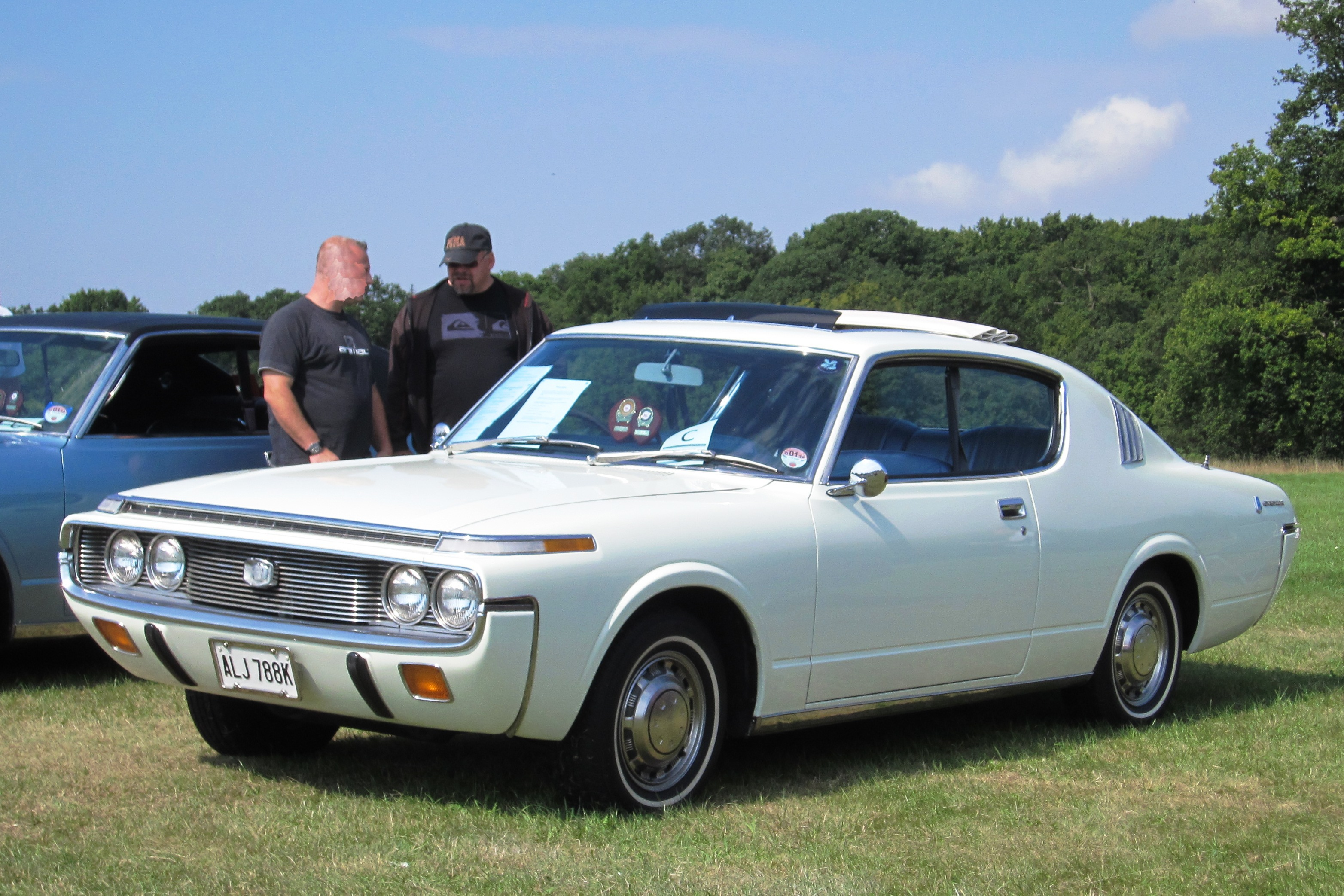
2600 Super Saloon Coupe (pre-facelift; UK)

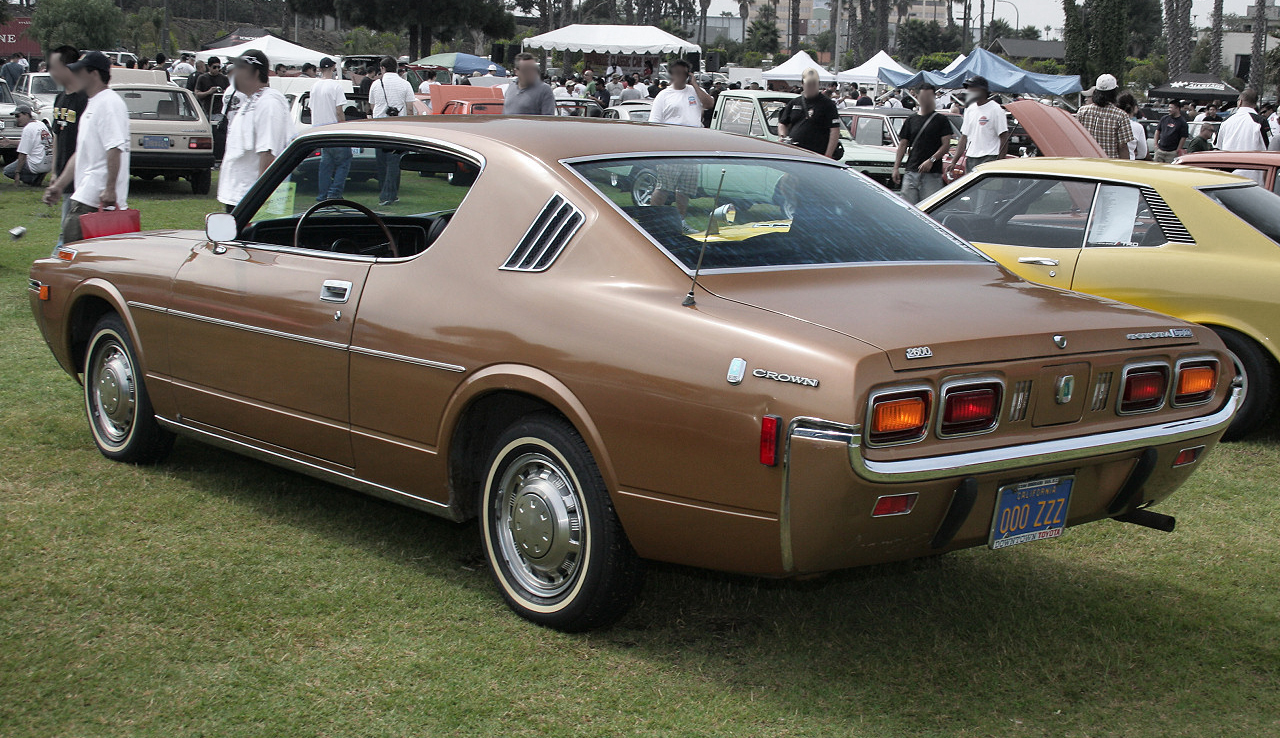
2600 Super Saloon Coupe (pre-facelift; US)

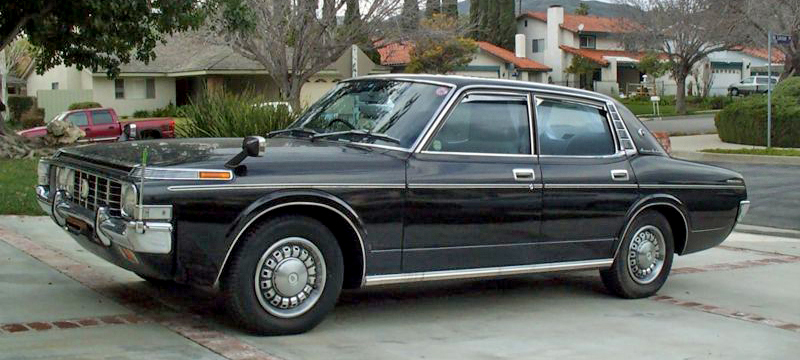
Super Saloon sedan (Japan)

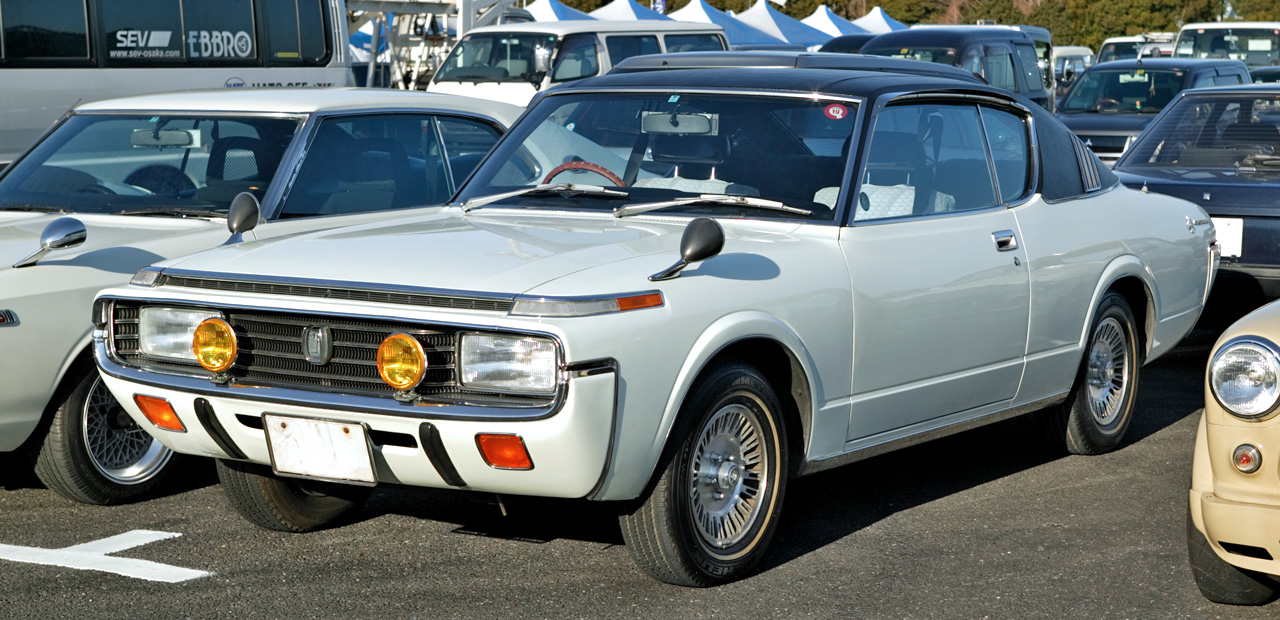
1971 Crown Hardtop 2000SL (Japan)

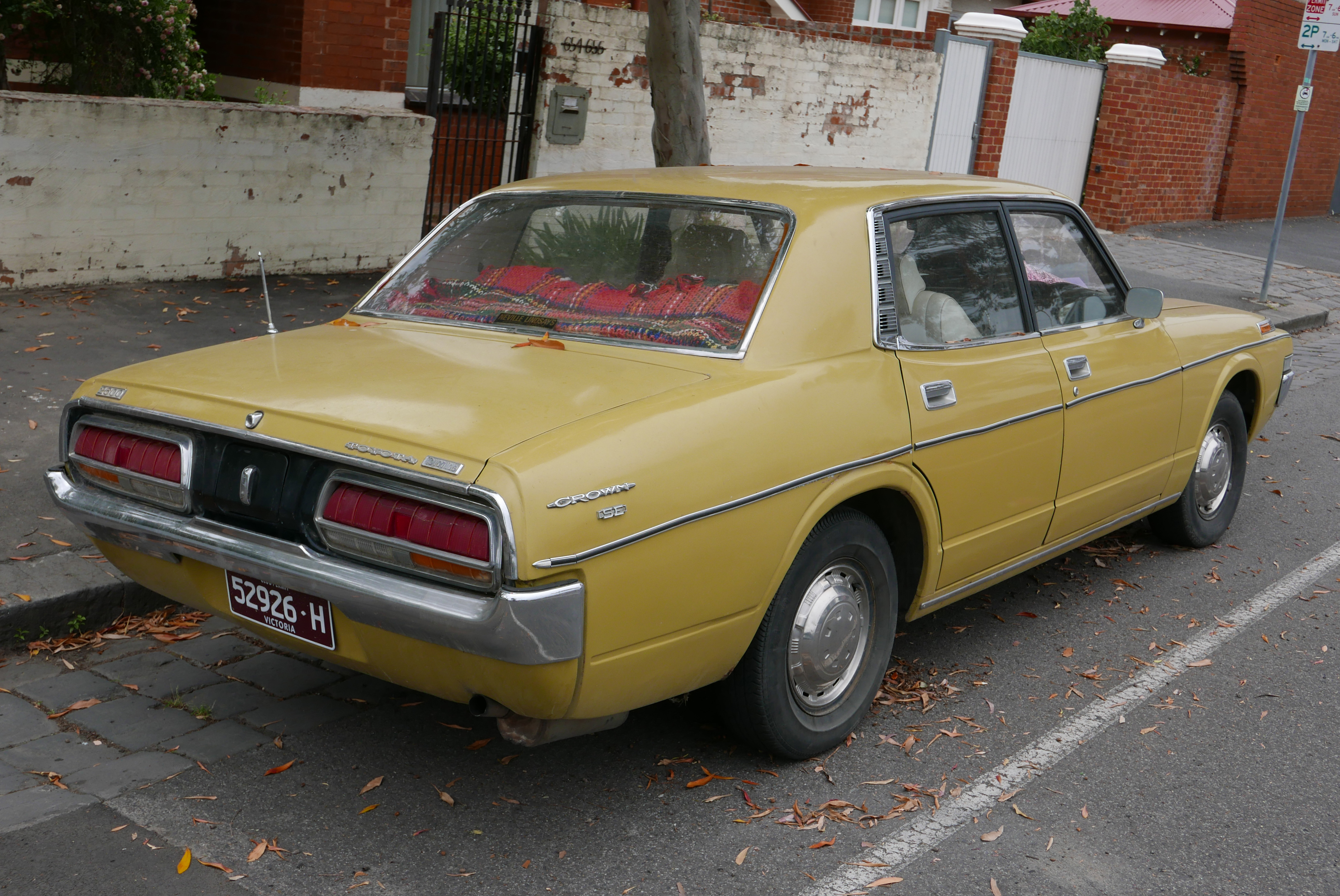
SE Sedan (facelift; Australia)

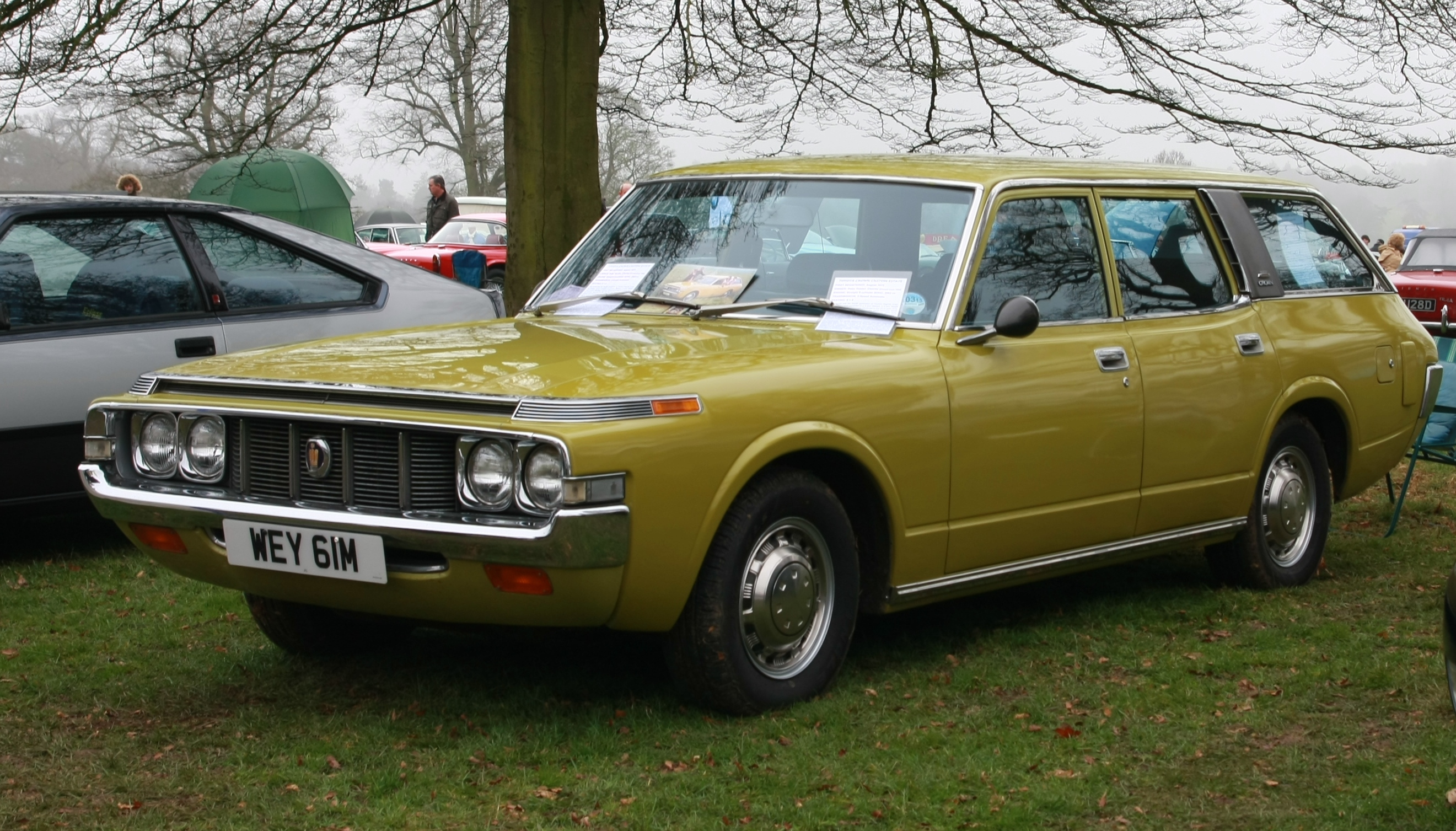
2600 Estate (facelift; UK)

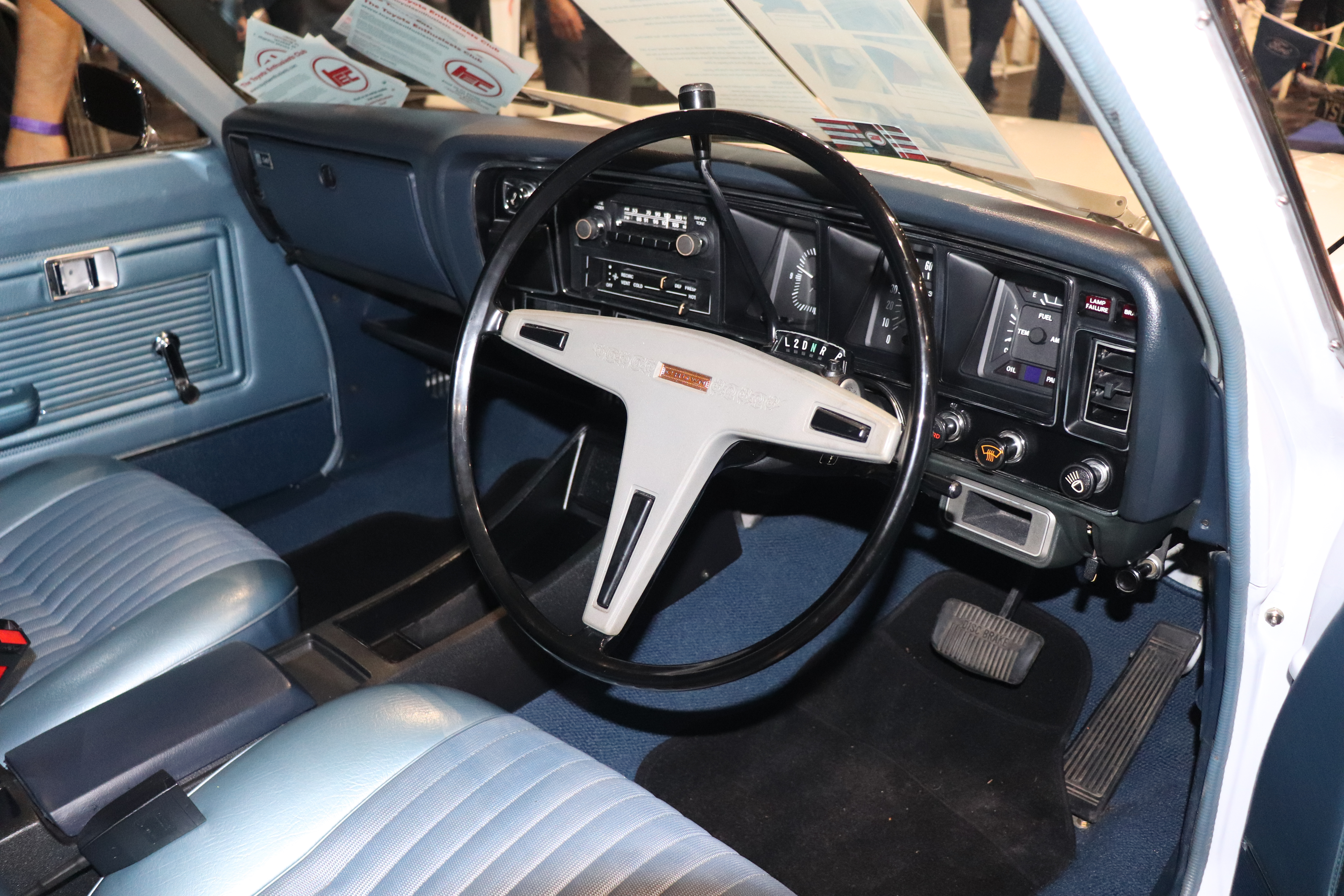
2600 Estate interior

== Fifth generation (S80/S90/S100; 1974) ==
Fifth generation
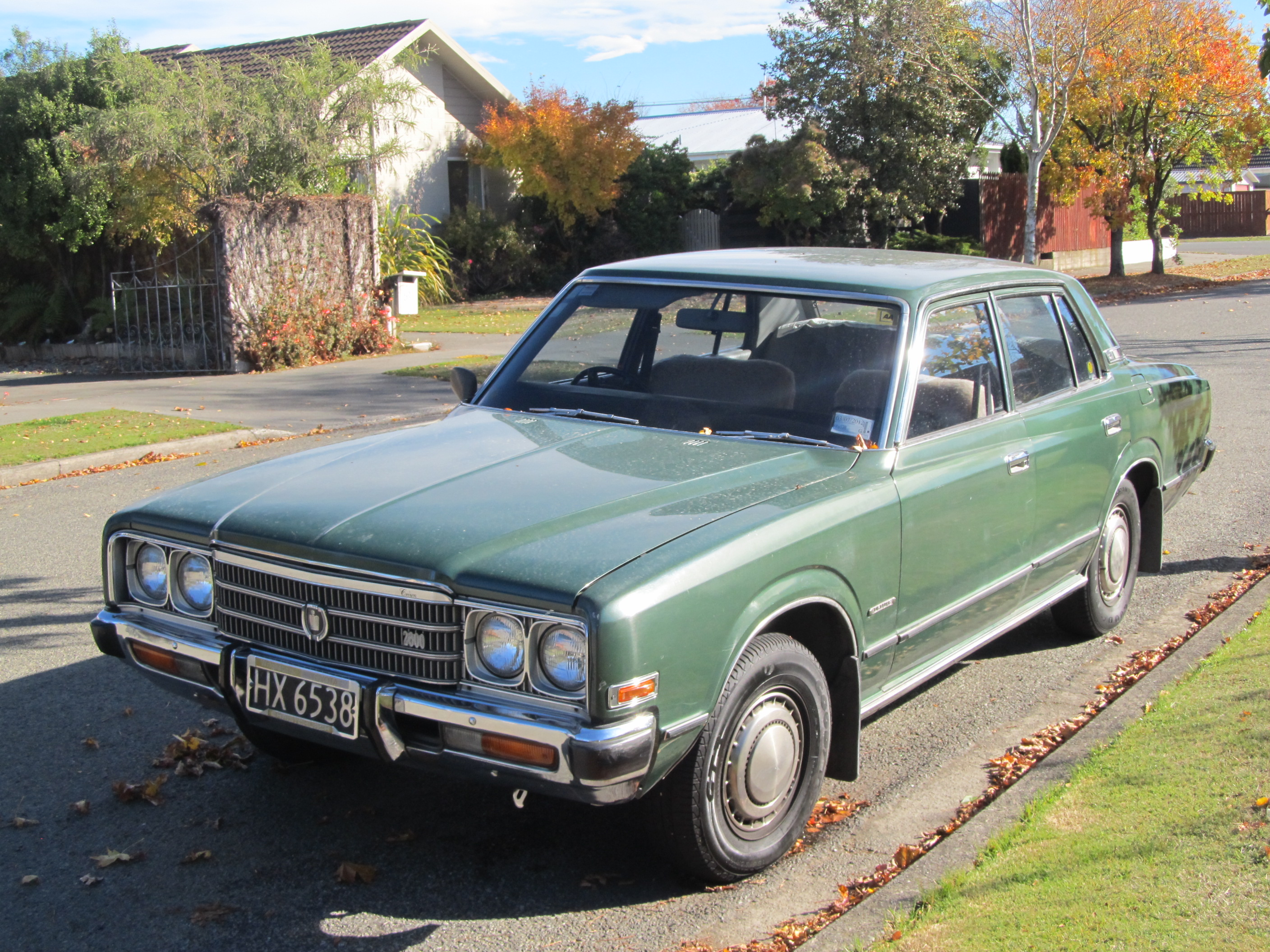
- 1978 Toyota Crown 2600 Deluxe (New Zealand)

Overview
- Model code: S80; S90; S100
- Production: October 1974 – August 1979

Body and chassis
- Body style: 4-door sedan; 4-door pillared hardtop sedan; 4-door station wagon; 2-door coupé
- Layout: Front-engine, rear-wheel-drive

Powertrain
- Engine: 2.0 L 5R I4; 2.0 L M I6; 2.6 L 4M I6; 2.2 L L diesel I4
- Transmission: 4/5-speed manual; 3/4-speed automatic

Dimensions
- Wheelbase: 2,690 mm (105.9 in)
- Length: 4,765 mm (187.6 in) (Royal Saloon); 4,690 mm (184.6 in)
- Width: 1,690 mm (66.5 in)
- Height: 1,440 mm (56.7 in)
- Curb weight: 1,470–1,520 kg (3,241–3,351 lb)

Launched in 1974 in Japan, export began in 1975. It was offered as a four-door sedan, two-door hardtop coupe, four-door hardtop sedan, wagon, and van. Engines are 2.0- and 2.6-liter gasoline. The 2.2-liter diesel was introduced in October 1977. Trim levels are Standard, Deluxe, Super Saloon, and Royal Saloon. The all-new pillared hardtop with the Royal Saloon trim package was the most exclusive Crown and was an alternative to the Nissan Cedric and Nissan Gloria, the traditional cross-town rival, while both the Cedric and Gloria were offered as genuine hardtop sedans beginning August 1972. This was the last series to offer a one-piece front bench seat; consecutive series offered a split front bench.

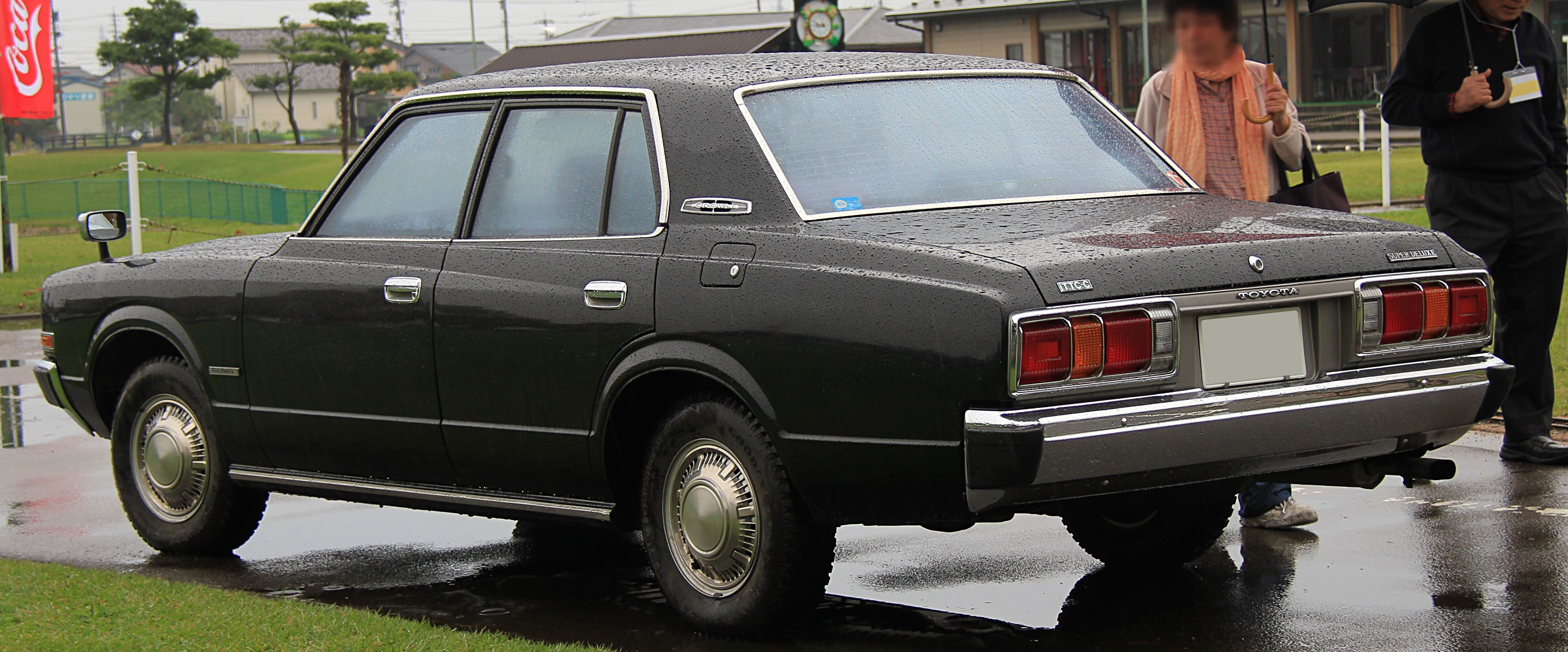
Pre-facelift Toyota Crown Super Deluxe Sedan (Japan)

The Royal Saloon came in a longer body length, coupled with the 2.6 L engine, while lower trim levels were in the shorter body style and 2.0 L engines. Export models used the same body, whether the two-liter 5R four-cylinder or the 2.6-liter 4M inline-six. In Europe, these models claimed 87 and 112 PS (64 and 82 kW) respectively.

Minor change was given in 1978. This version of the Crown saw the introduction of disc brakes at both the front and rear axles with anti-lock brakes, speed sensitive power steering, and a 4-speed automatic transmission with overdrive. Originally, sedans and wagons had S80-series chassis numbers, while the two- and four-door hardtops received the S90-series chassis numbers. After 1976 and concurrent with the introduction of new stricter emissions regulations, all Japanese market Crowns used S100-series chassis numbers. Export models continued to use the previous codes.

Initially available with the "old style" 4M engine with a rounded valve cover, later models switched to the new 4M engine with a rectangular valve cover. This generation also saw the introduction of fuel injection on both the 2.6-liter 4M and the 2.0-liter M engines, coupled with Toyota's TTC-C technology, adding a catalytic converter to the exhaust system. The emissions-controlling technology badge helped identify which vehicles had reduced emissions tax liability. Select models with four-wheel disc brakes and twin-piston calipers on the front brakes were also available. The models installed with the diesel engine were exclusive to Toyota Diesel Store locations.

The Hardtop Sedan model has a front chrome grille and square headlights, but was no longer considered a true hardtop, due to the inclusion of a "B" pillar. The styling differences between the hardtop and sedan four-door models was that the side windows on the hardtop were frameless, and the rear window was sloped more than the formal appearing sedan. This series Crown in the Royal Saloon trim package exceeded length regulations of 4.7 m set forth by Japanese regulations by 65 mm, but Toyota continued to offer a 2.0 L engine in a shorter vehicle for buyers who were looking for better fuel economy over the larger six-cylinder engines, and reduced road tax liability.

New Zealand models were assembled in New Zealand but on an SKD basis - which meant it had more Japanese content (such as glass) than earlier CKD versions. It was the last Crown built in New Zealand and was replaced in 1979 by the Cressida (Mark II), which was available with a four-cylinder engine. The oil crises of 1973/4 and 1979/80 had led the government to impose a 60 percent sales tax on larger engines, and the Crown could no longer be priced to suit its market. This generation Crown was locally assembled in Australia (except for the imported "Super Saloon" trim), and only available with the largest 2.6-liter six-cylinder engine. It was never a strong seller in Australia, offering less performance and roadholding than the domestic competitors from Ford and Holden.

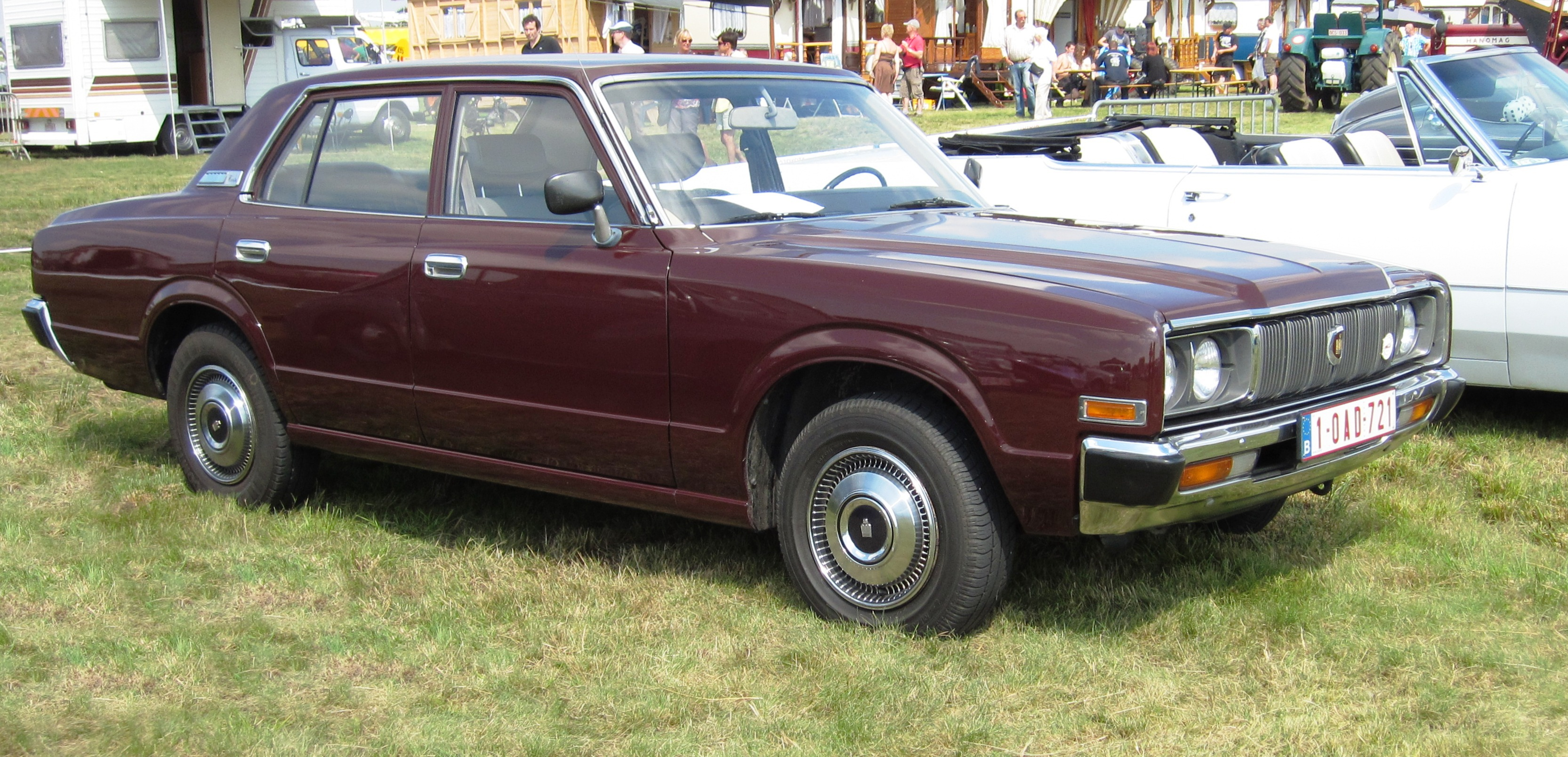
Pre-facelift Crown Sedan (Europe)

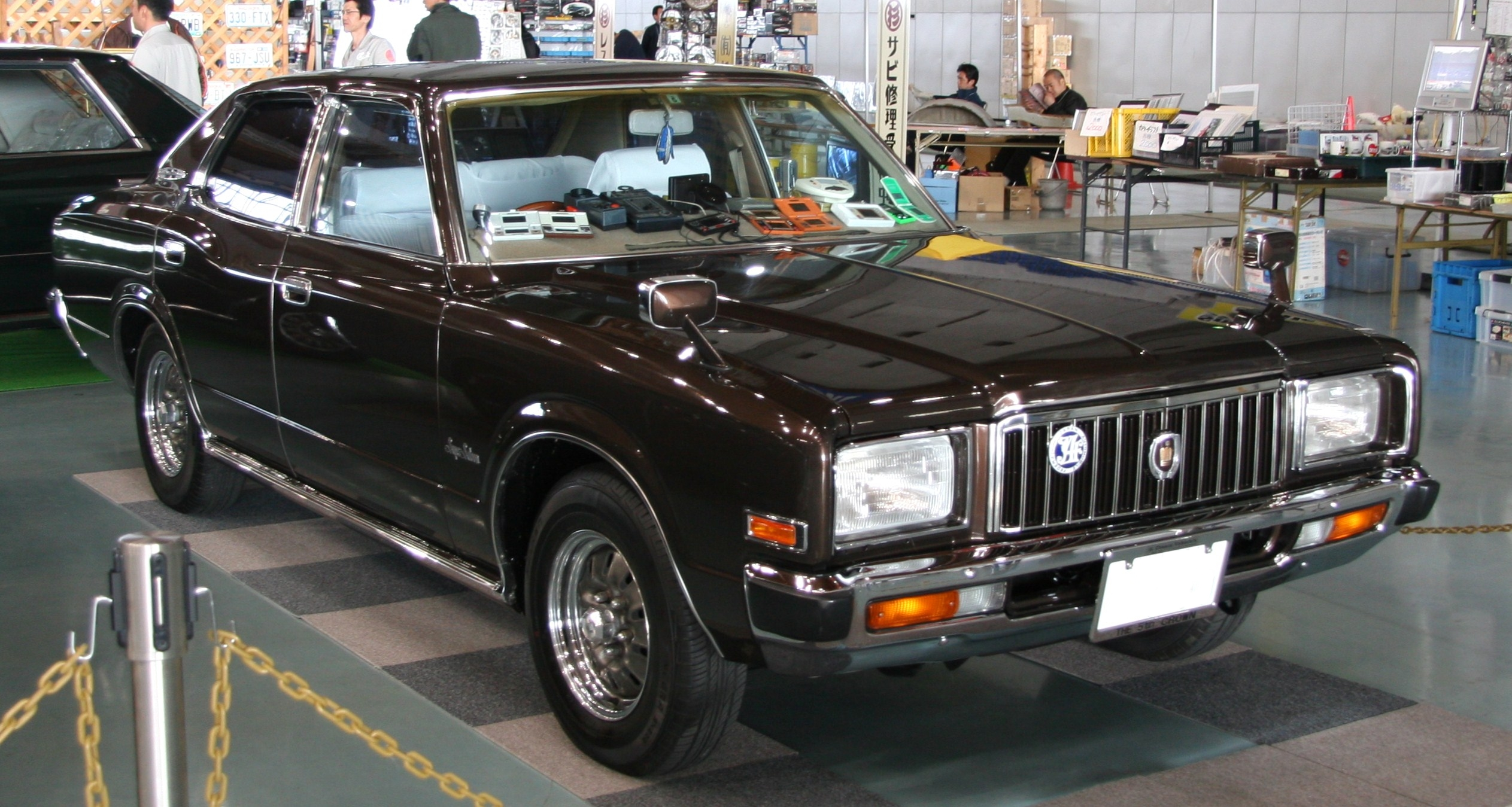
Pre-facelift Crown Hardtop Super Saloon (MS85)

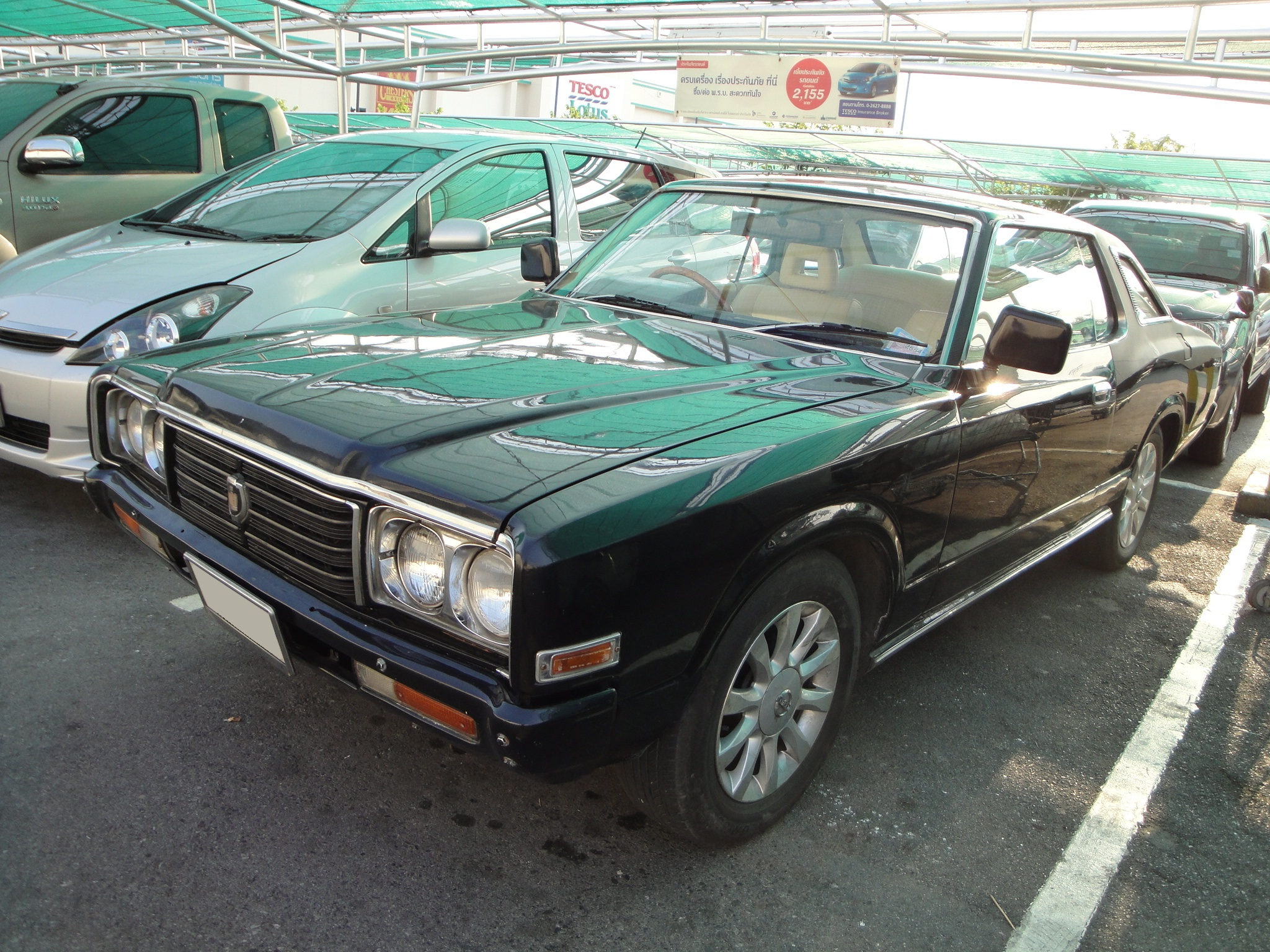
S90 series Crown coupé

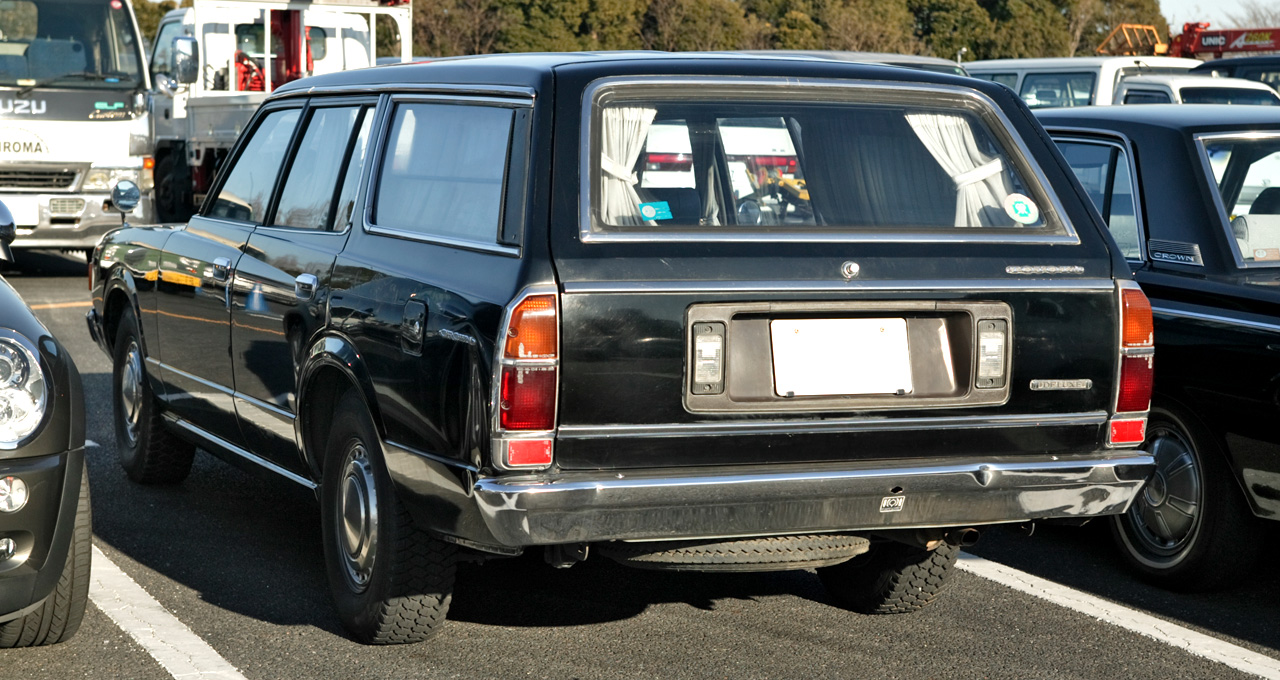
S80 series Crown station wagon

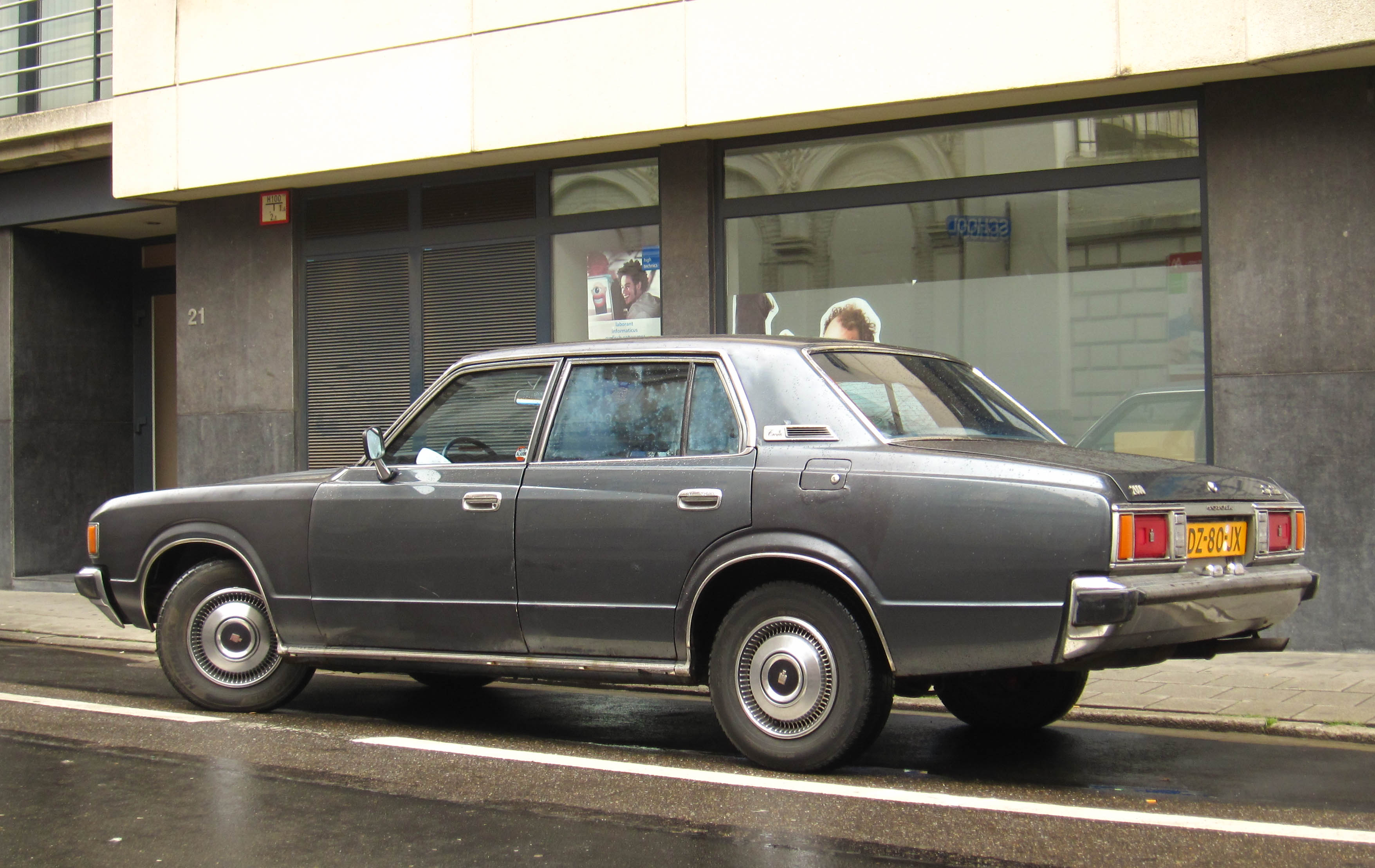
Facelift model Crown 2600 Super Saloon (Europe)

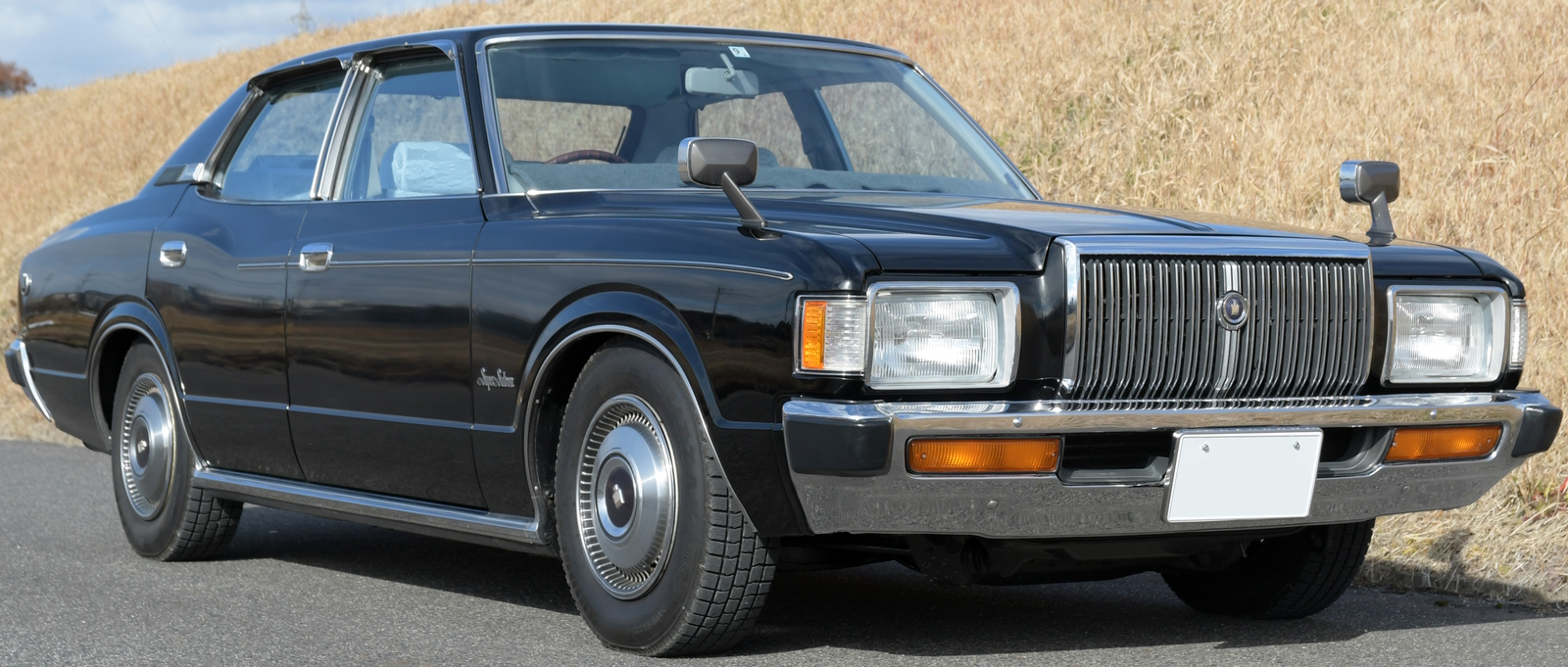
Facelift Crown Hardtop Super Saloon Extra (MS105)

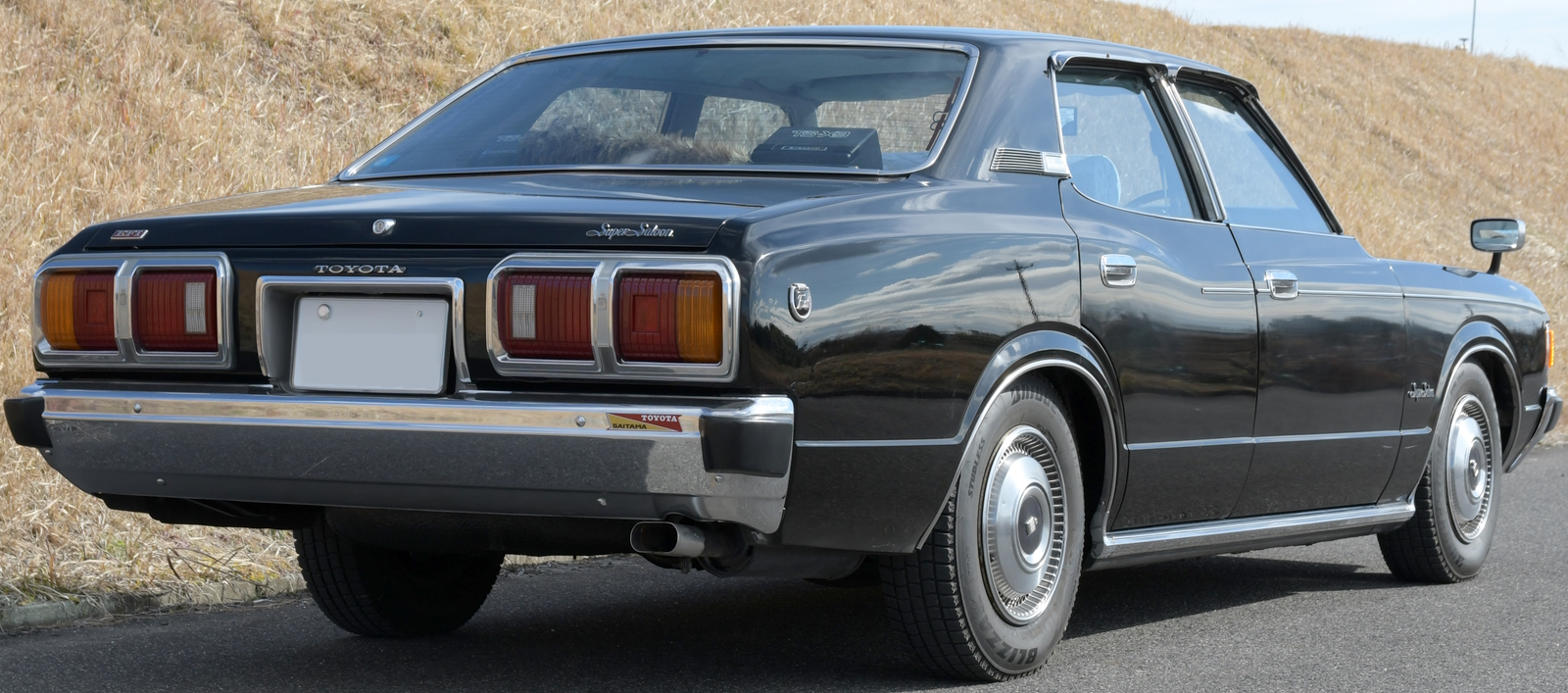
Facelift Crown Hardtop Super Saloon Extra (MS105)

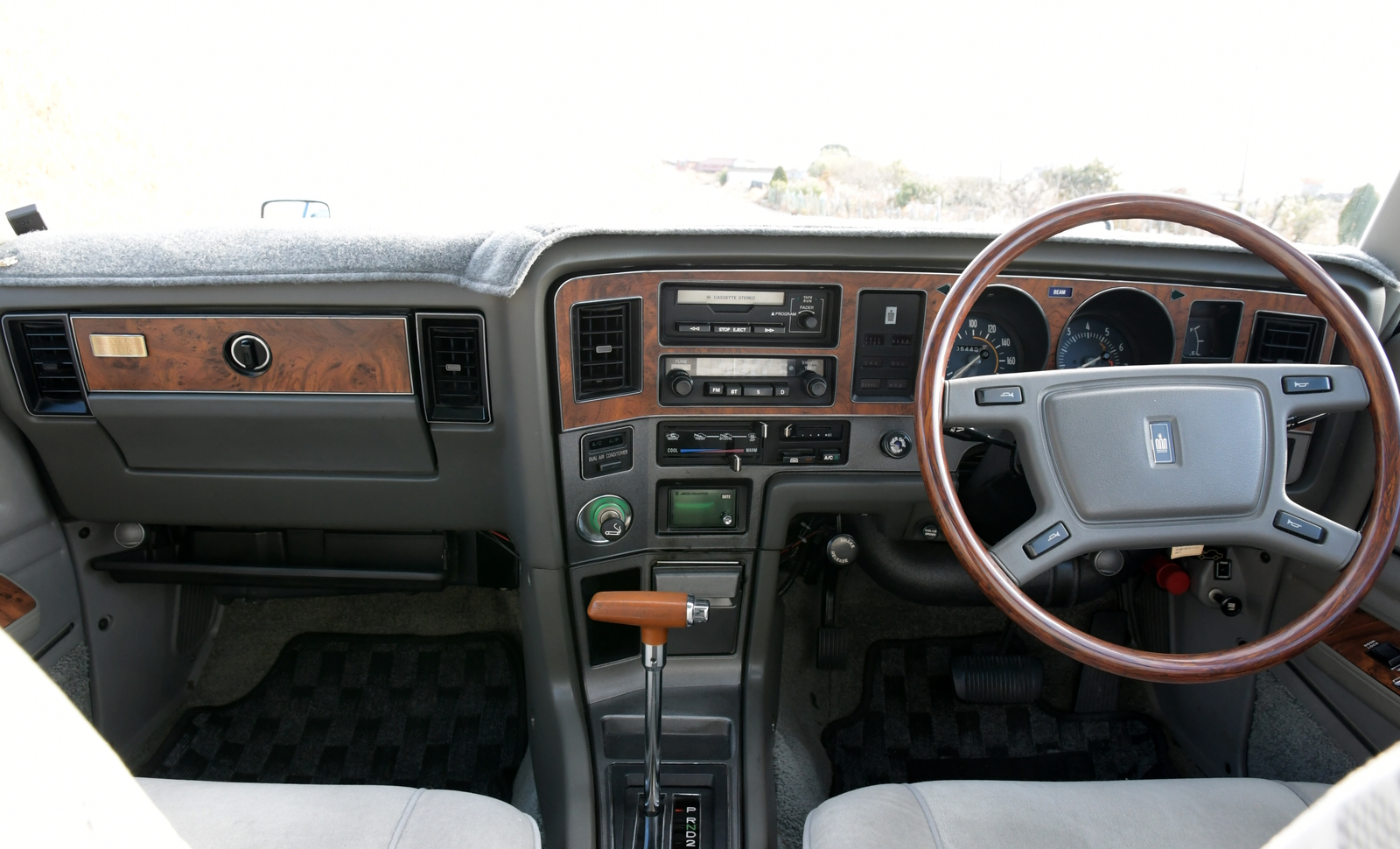
interior (1978 minor facelift)

== Sixth generation (S110; 1979) ==
Sixth generation
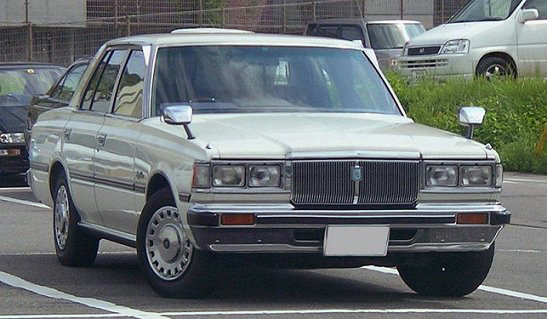
- 1979 Toyota Crown Super Saloon

Overview
- Model code: S110
- Production: September 1979 – August 1983

Body and chassis
- Body style: 4-door sedan; 4-door pillared hardtop sedan; 4-door station wagon; 2-door coupé
- Layout: Front-engine, rear-wheel-drive

Powertrain
- Engine: 1994 cc 5R-U I4; 1988 cc M-E I6; 1988 cc M-PU LPG I6; 1988 cc M-TEU turbo I6; 1988 cc 1G-EU I6; 2563 cc 4M I6; 2759 cc 5M, E/GE I6; 2188 cc L diesel I4 (LS110/117V); 2446 cc 2L-T/TE TD I4 (LS111)
- Transmission: 3/4-speed automatic; 3/4/5-speed manual

Dimensions
- Wheelbase: 2,690 mm (105.9 in)
- Length: 4,860 mm (191.3 in) (Royal Saloon); 4,690 mm (184.6 in)
- Width: 1,715 mm (67.5 in) (Royal Saloon); 1,690 mm (66.5 in)
- Height: 1,410 mm (55.5 in)
- Curb weight: 1,500–1,610 kg (3,307–3,549 lb)

Launched in 1979, this model had the engine upgraded from the 2.6 L to 2.8 L 5M-EU model. The 2-liter M was still on offer along with a turbocharged version – the M-TEU. The carbureted 5M engine was also available in certain markets. In this series the model designation referred to the engine size – MS110 (2-liter), MS111 (2.6-liter), MS112 (2.8-liter). This was the last generation to install a four-cylinder, gasoline-powered engine. This model was the first generation Crown to be sold in Germany, beginning in 1980. The fuel injected 2.8 developed 145 PS (107 kW) in European trim, while the 2.2 diesel offered 66 PS (49 kW) and a choice of five-speed manual or an automatic (not in the Station Wagon). European sales started out at a respectable level, but with prices increasing at an alarming rate due to the appreciation of the yen, sales had dropped drastically by 1982.

Early models have twin rectangular headlights, while facelift models come with bigger monoblock headlights. Domestic market Royal Saloons use the large rectangular headlights. Lower grades Van and Taxi models adopted round headlights. Royal Saloon features longer bumpers and bigger engines, which were placed in a larger road tax classification according to Japanese government dimension regulations. The first Crown Turbo was launched in October 1980 for Japanese market only. Offering the 2.0 L engines was for buyers who didn't want to pay the large car tax, while offering better fuel economy than the larger engines. The turbo also provided a benefit in increasing fuel efficiency while reducing tailpipe emissions as Japanese consumers pay a tax on the amount of regulated substances being sent into the atmosphere from a Japanese law passed in the 1970s.

In some export markets, such as Southeast Asia, the larger six-cylinder engines came fitted with carburettors. In those specs, the 2.6 offered 110 PS (81 kW) SAE net while the 2.8 claimed 128 PS (94 kW) DIN or 120 SAE net. Sales in Indonesia were low and this generation was not replaced there in 1984, when the 120-series Crown appeared.

This generation is the last for the two-door hardtop coupé bodystyle, which was replaced by the Soarer. Reflecting a popular styling appearance during the 1970s, the coupé was fitted with a padded vinyl roof and "opera windows" for a luxurious appearance. Some of the options that became available were an Electronic compass, glass moon roof, power drivers seat, cruise control, electronic stereo tuner, and two-tone paint. Automatic climate control also appeared on this vehicle with separate controls installed for rear seat passengers as well as a rear-mounted mini fridge cooled by the separate rear seat air conditioning unit. The 2.4-liter turbo-diesel appeared in August 1982.

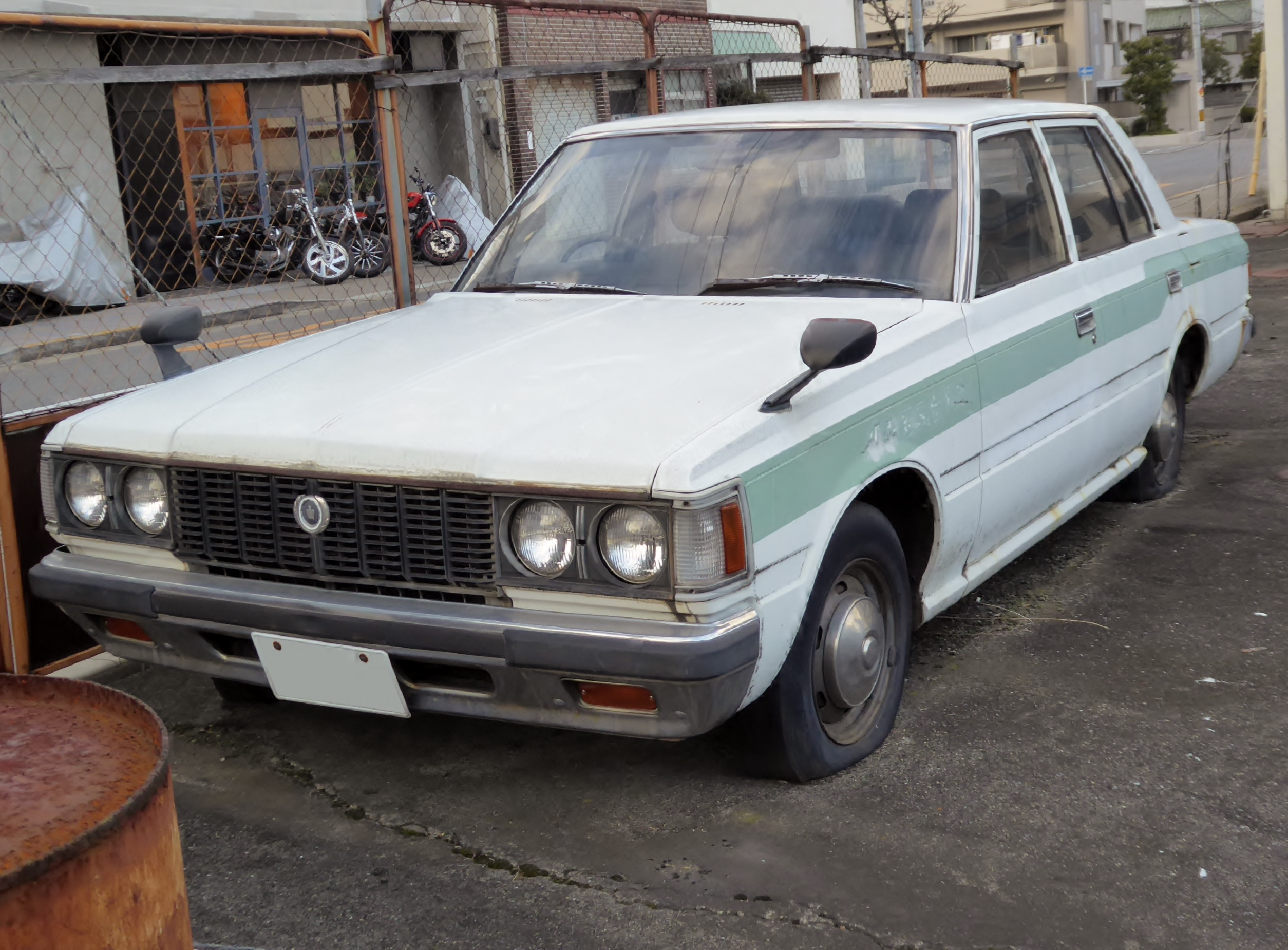
Toyota Crown Sedan 2.2 diesel Standard for taxi (LS110, Japan)

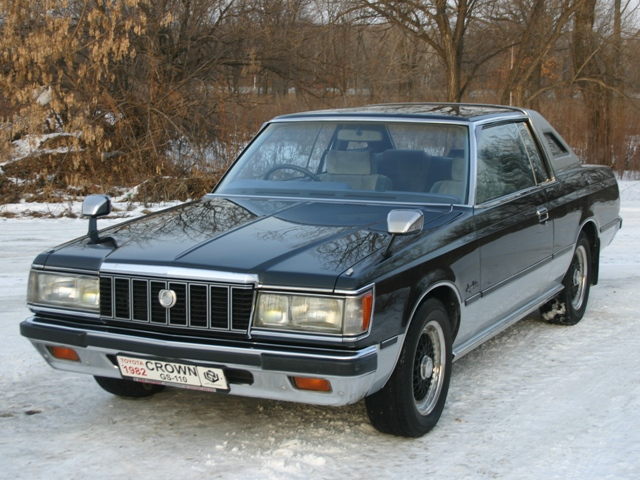
Toyota Crown hardtop coupé (GS110, Japan)

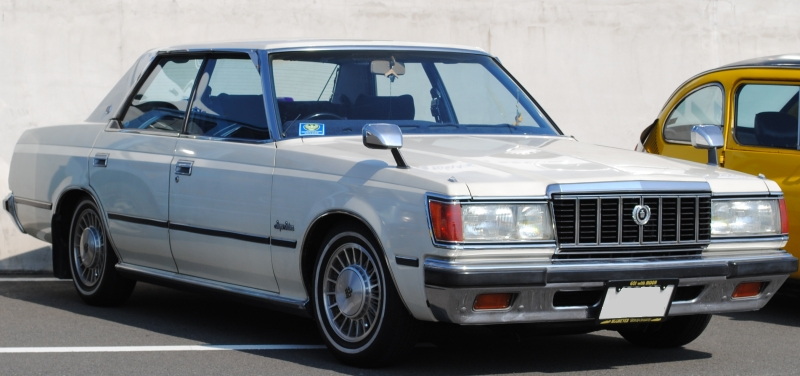
Toyota Crown 4-door hardtop Super Saloon

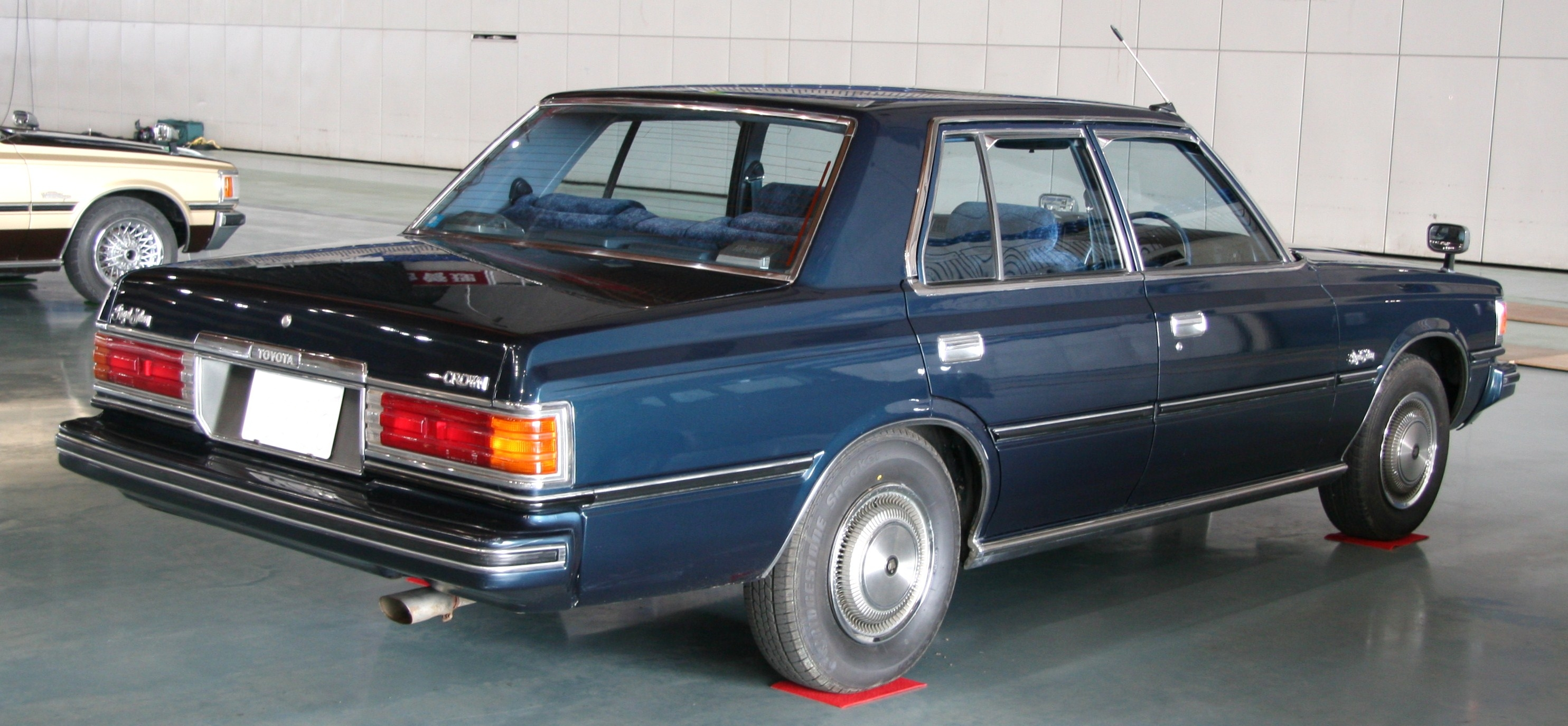
Toyota Crown sedan Royal Saloon (Japan)

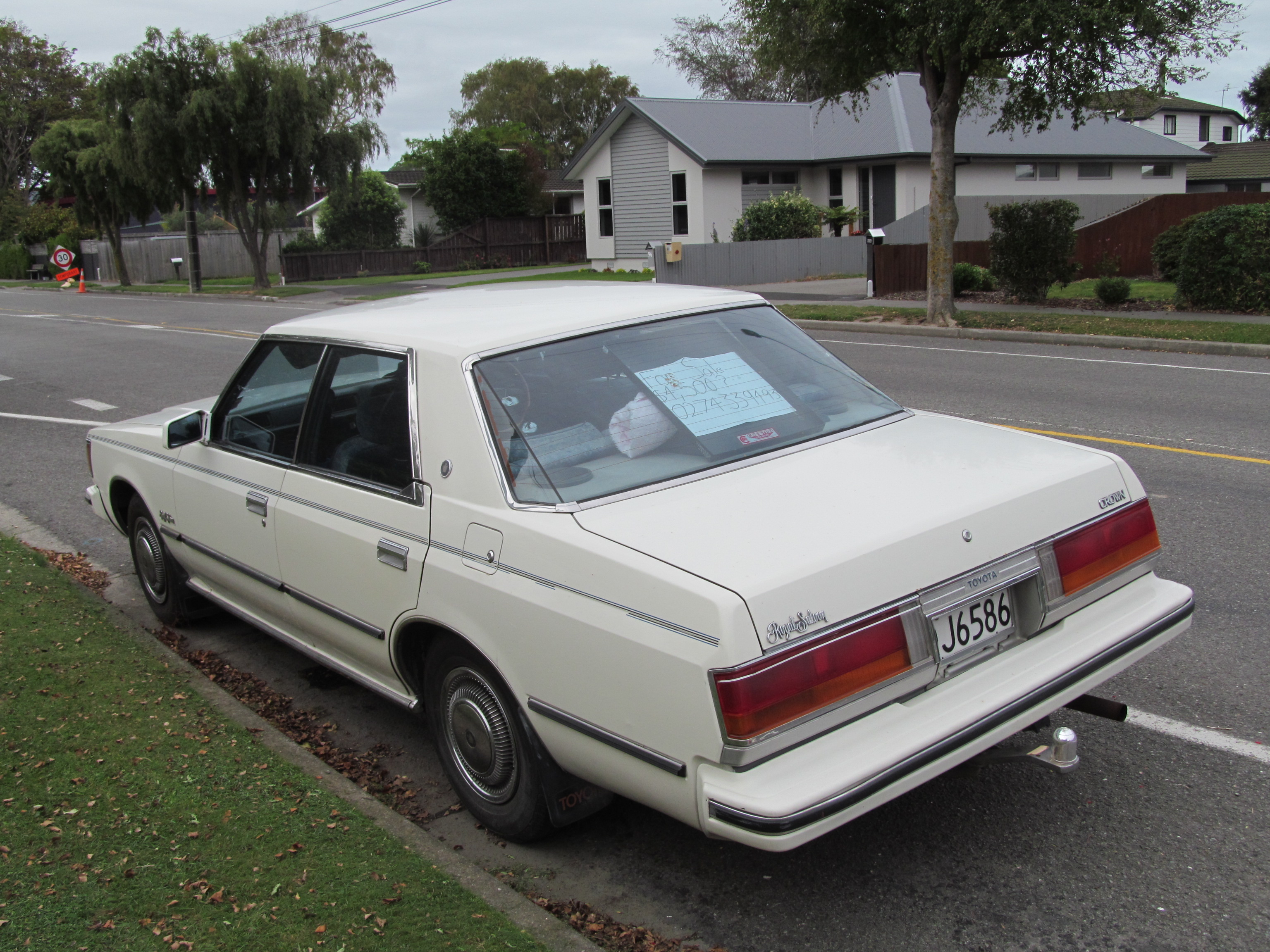
Toyota Crown 4-door hardtop 2.8 Royal Saloon (MS112)

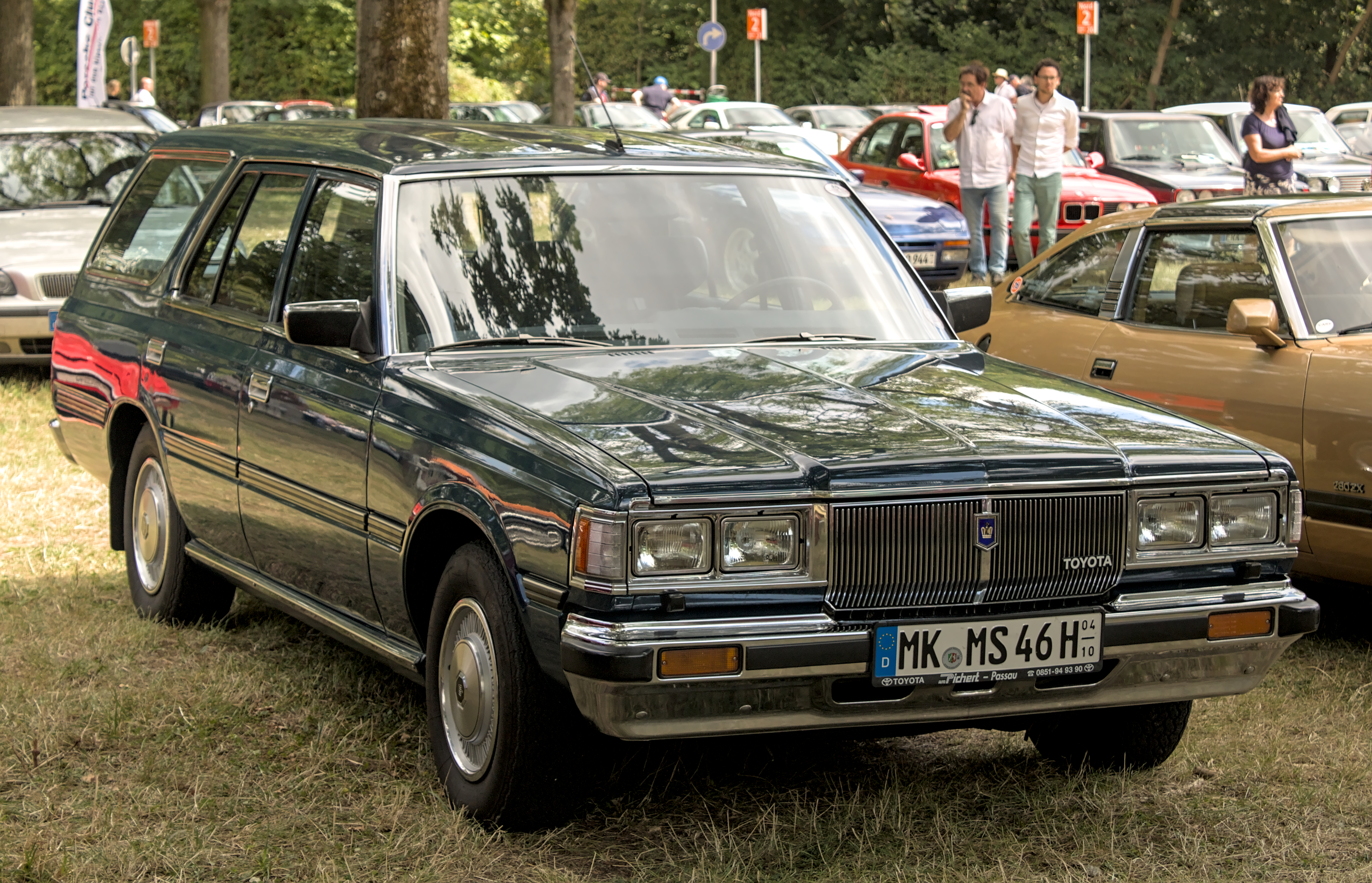
Toyota Crown Station Wagon 2.8 Super Saloon (Europe)

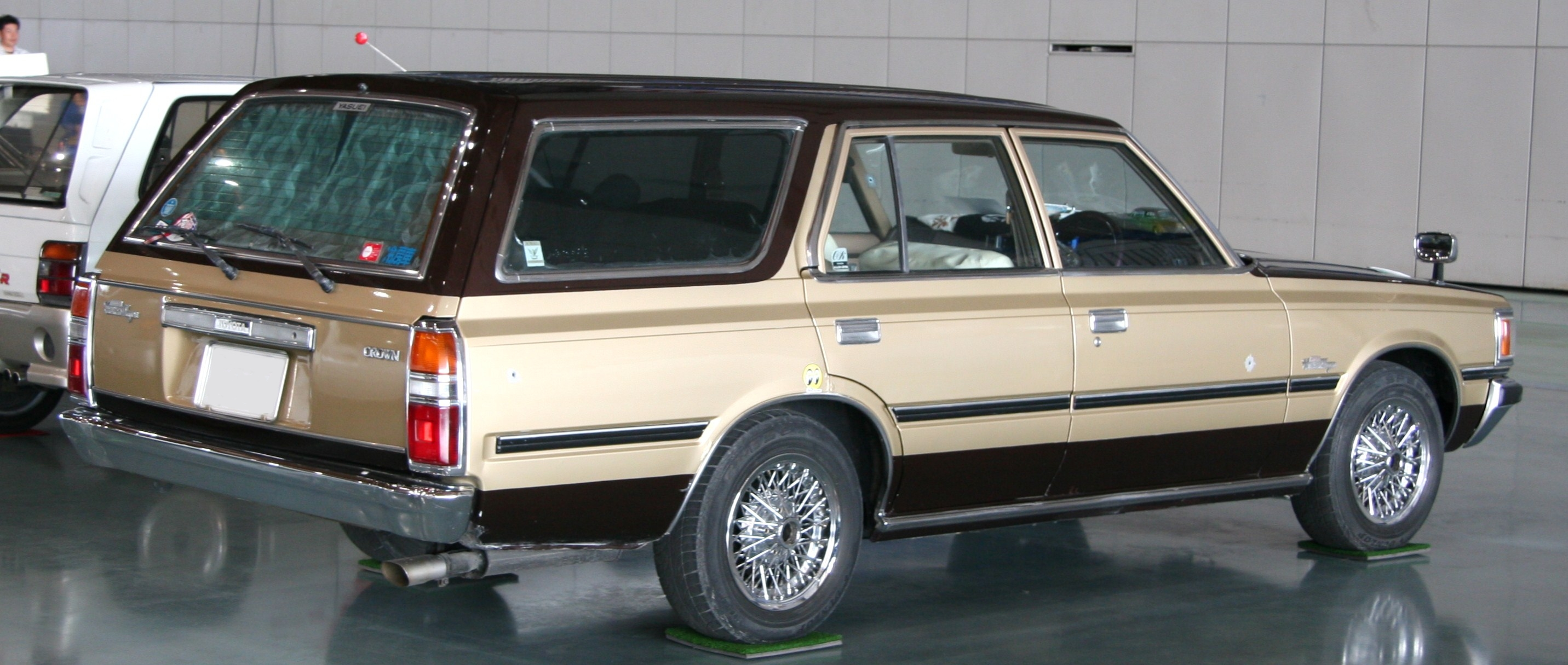
Toyota Crown Station Wagon (Japan)

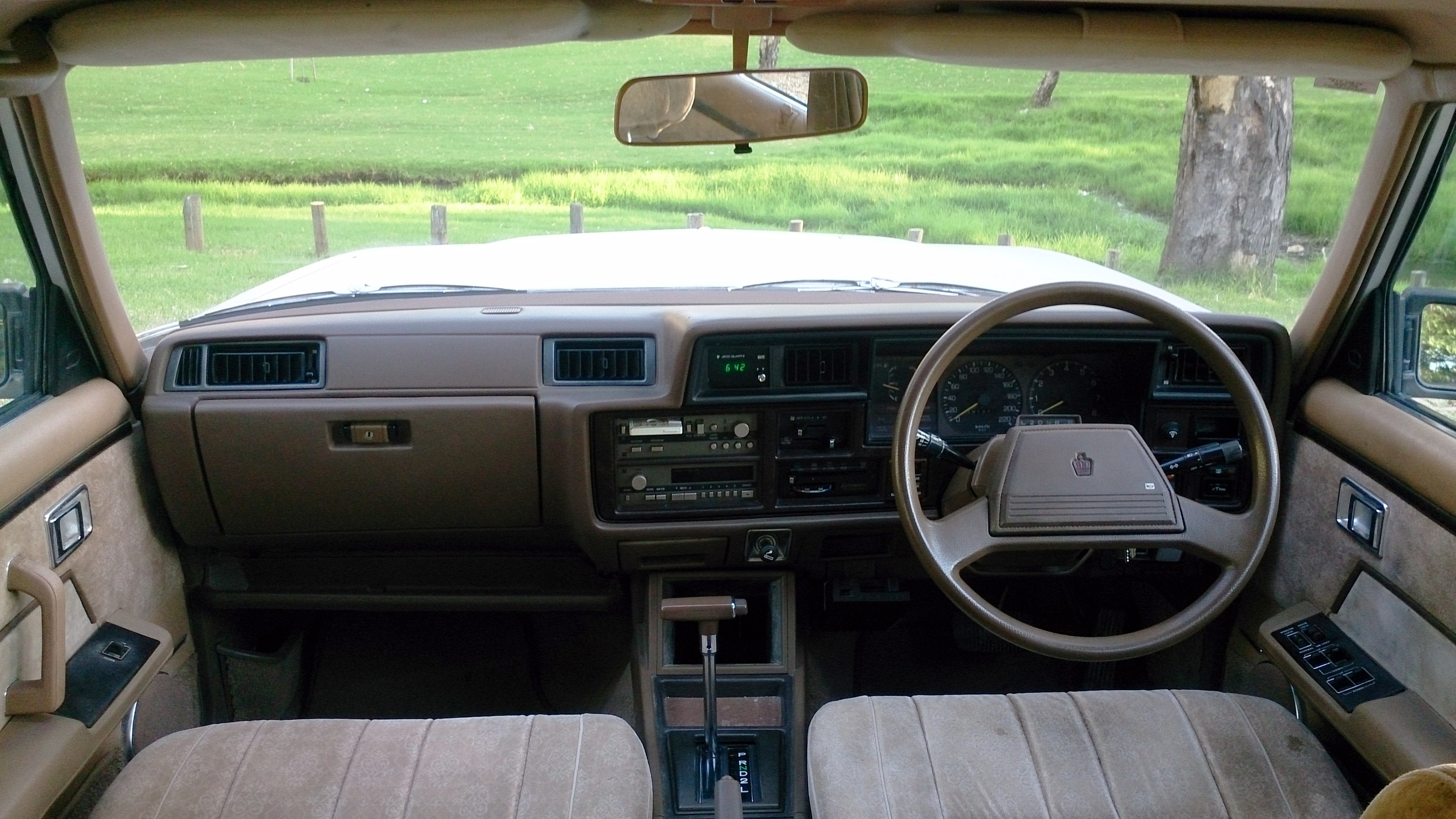
MS112 Crown interior

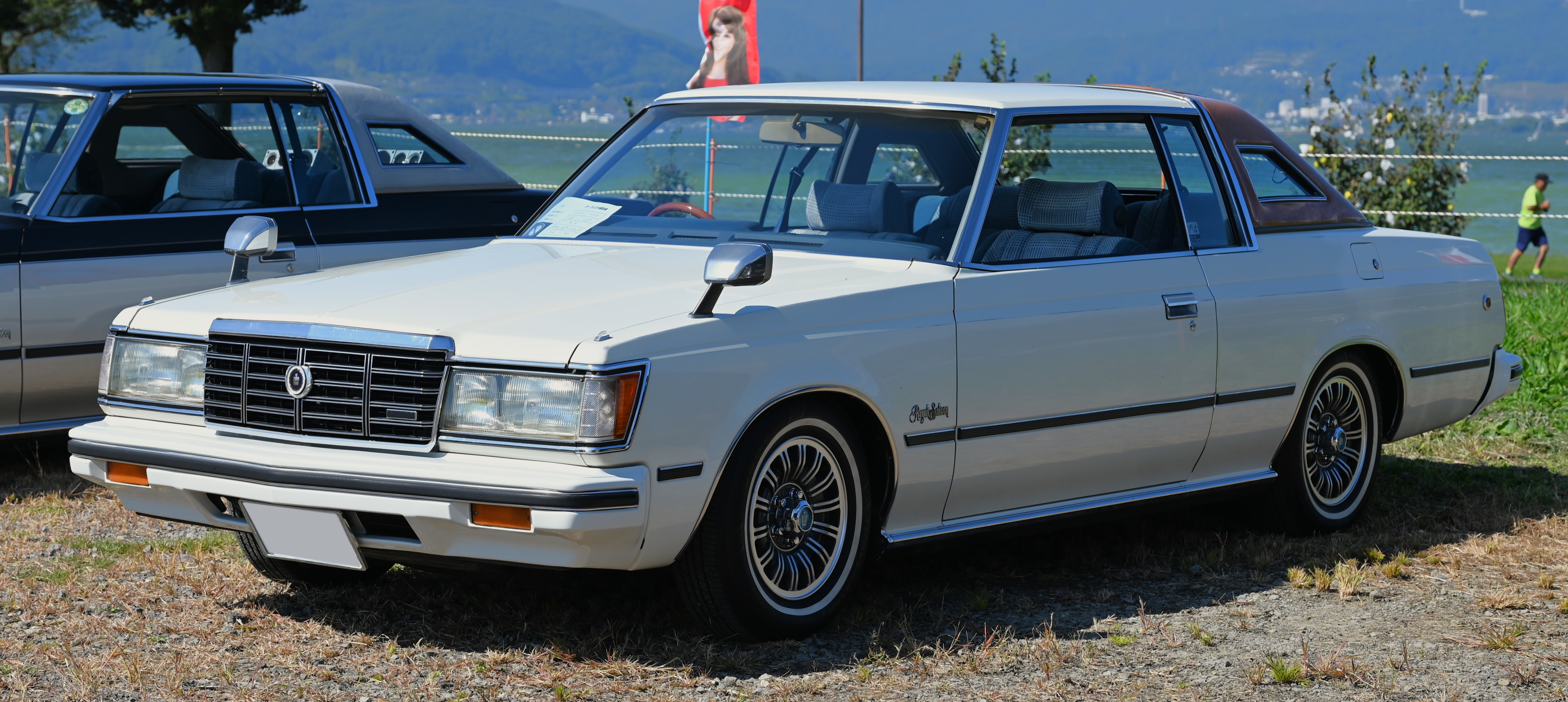
Facelift model Crown 2-door Hardtop Royal Saloon (MS110)

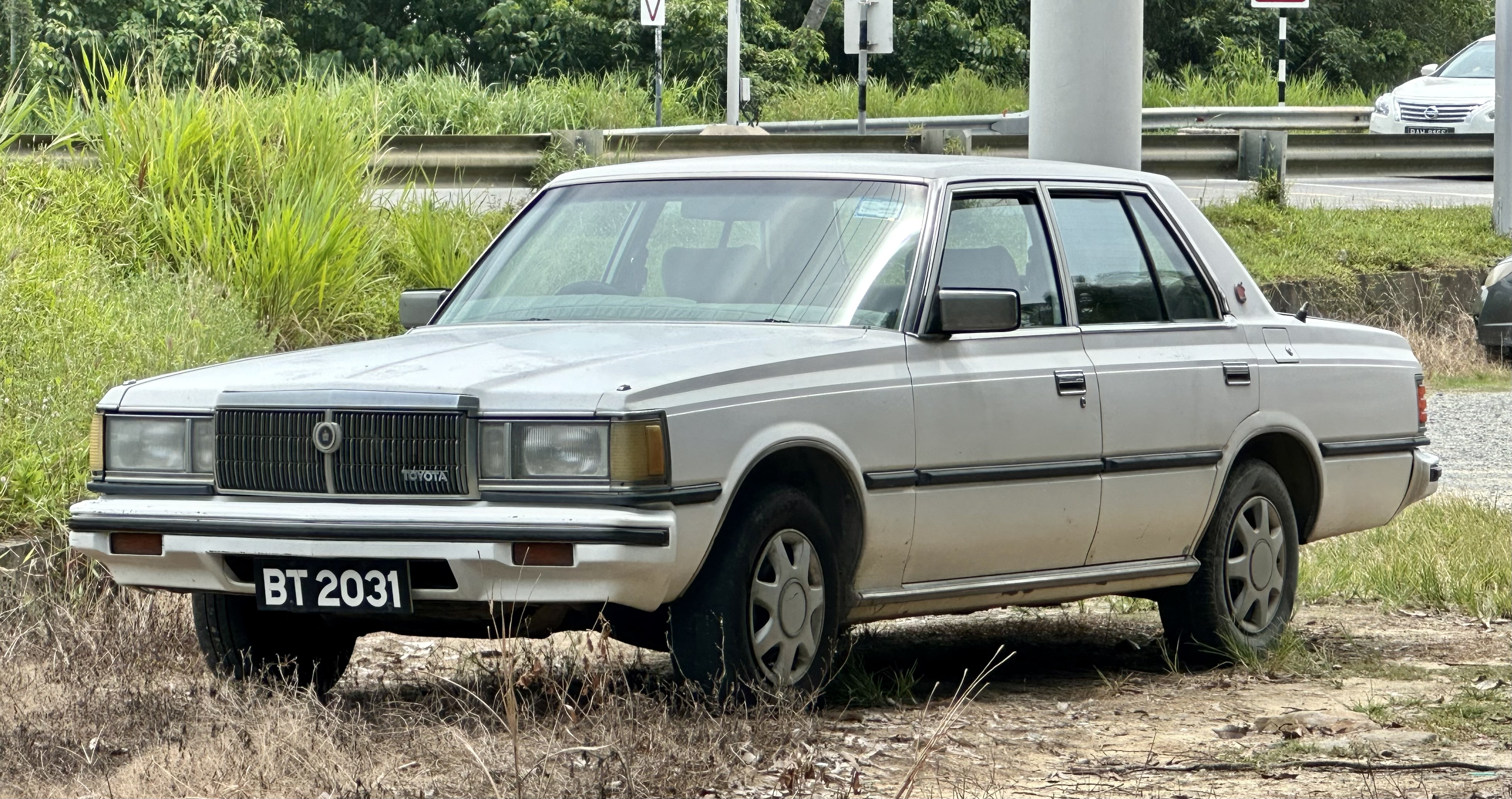
Facelift model Crown sedan (Brunei)

== Seventh generation (S120; 1983) ==
Seventh generation
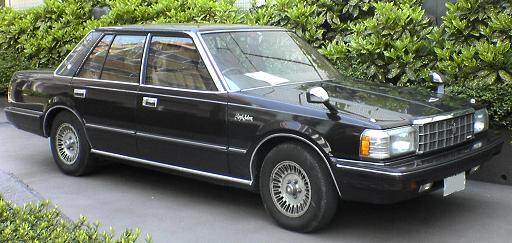
- Toyota Crown Royal Saloon (S120, Japan)

Overview
- Model code: S120
- Production: 1983–1987

Body and chassis
- Body style: 4-door sedan; 4-door pillared hardtop sedan; 4-door station wagon
- Layout: Front-engine, rear-wheel-drive

Powertrain
- Engine: 2.0L 3Y/3Y-PU OHV I4 (YS120); 2.0L 1G-E I6 (GS120/126V); 2.0L 1G-GE DOHC I6 (GS121); 2.0L 1G-GZE DOHC S/C I6 (GS121); 2.0L M-E/M-PU I6 (MS120); 2.0L M-TE turbo I6 (MS120); 2.8L 5M/5M-E I6 (MS122); 2.8L 5M-GE DOHC I6 (MS123); 3.0L 6M-GEU DOHC I6 (MS125); 2.4L 2L diesel I4 (LS120/126V); 2.4L 2L-T/TE/THE turbo-diesel I4 (LS120)

Dimensions
- Wheelbase: 2,720 mm (107.1 in)
- Length: 4,860 mm (191.3 in) (Royal Saloon); 4,690 mm (184.6 in)
- Width: 1,720 mm (67.7 in) (Royal Saloon); 1,695 mm (66.7 in)
- Height: 1,400–1,515 mm (55.1–59.6 in)
- Curb weight: 1,410–1,875 kg (3,109–4,134 lb)

Launched in 1983, this model used all three versions of the 5M 2.8L engine: the carburetted 5M version, the single overhead cam (SOHC) multi-point fuel-injected 5M-E version, and the double overhead cam (DOHC) 5M-GE. Other engines included the 1G-GE 2.0L DOHC, M-TE 2.0L single overhead cam (SOHC) Turbo, M-E 2.0L SOHC, 2L-TE 2.4L SOHC Turbo Diesel Ceramics Power or 2.4L SOHC Diesel Ceramics Power engines. All 2.0 L engines were installed with T-VIS (Toyota Variable Induction System). In September 1985, a supercharged version of the 2-liter G-series six replaced the turbocharged M-series.

Base versions use the new 2-liter 1G-E engine which replaced the old 2-liter version of the M series. The Japanese market "van" version of the station wagon (the GS126V as well as the GS136V in the following series) used its own unique variant of this motor which took advantage of laxer emissions standards for commercial vehicles (the 1G-EJ). In Japan, taxi and commercial versions were also available with an LPG-powered four-cylinder engine (the 3Y) which was even offered with a three-speed, column-shifted manual. A gasoline-fueled version of this engine was available in some European and "general" export markets.

The lower-grade models were available with Toyota's F292 live axle rear suspension while the rest introduced 4-wheel independent suspension branded as PEGASUS (Precision Engineered Geometrically Advanced Suspension) on the Crown for the first time, with TEMS installed on the Royal Saloon sedan and hardtops, coupled with Toyota's ECT electronically controlled four-speed automatic transmission, and 4ESC anti-lock brakes.

The S120 was available in Hardtop sedan (frameless door glass), sedan and wagon versions but in two different exterior dimensions for length and width, with the Royal Saloon hardtop and sedan only offered in the larger body.

The top-trim package was called the Royal Saloon, followed by Super Saloon Extra, Super Select for hardtop bodystyles, followed by the Royal Saloon sedan, Super Saloon Extra sedan, and the wagon came only as Super Saloon Extra.

The Super Saloon Extra and Royal Saloon versions were packed with features such as dual-zone climate control, AM/FM cassette stereo with six acoustically matched speakers, combined with a separate rear cassette stereo with headphones, with dashboard-installed integrated CD player, and separate A/C and stereo control buttons installed in the rear armrest, parcel shelf mounted refrigerator, automatic headlights, reading lamps for all outboard seating positions, electrically adjusted tilt and telescoping steering column combined with a steering wheel and seat memory feature, glovebox mounted courtesy mirror among many things, while the slightly lower trim package Super Select was more modestly equipped.

One distinctive styling feature of this generation was the use of a clear panel with patterned backing for the C-pillar trim on the sedans. For the Japanese market only, Toyota made the 190 PS (140 kW) Twincam 12-valve 3.0-liter 6M-GE available on the Royal Saloon for the mid-cycle update. This engine is a popular swap for 5M-GE powered Supras and Cressidas of the same period.

This was the last generation Crown to be commonly available in European markets. The fuel injected 2.8-liter engine in European trim produces 170 PS (125 kW) at 5600 rpm and had identical specifications to the Supra sold there at the time. Swiss buyers, however, had to make do with the single-cam 140 PS (103 kW) 5M-E engine due to their particular emissions restrictions.

For general export markets such as Southeast Asia and the GCC countries, the carburetted 5M engine was also available. This version produces 128 PS (94 kW) at 5000 rpm and was even available with a four-speed manual transmission. For the even more frugal buyer, the carburetted OHV 3Y engine with 88 PS (65 kW) at 4600 rpm was also on offer.

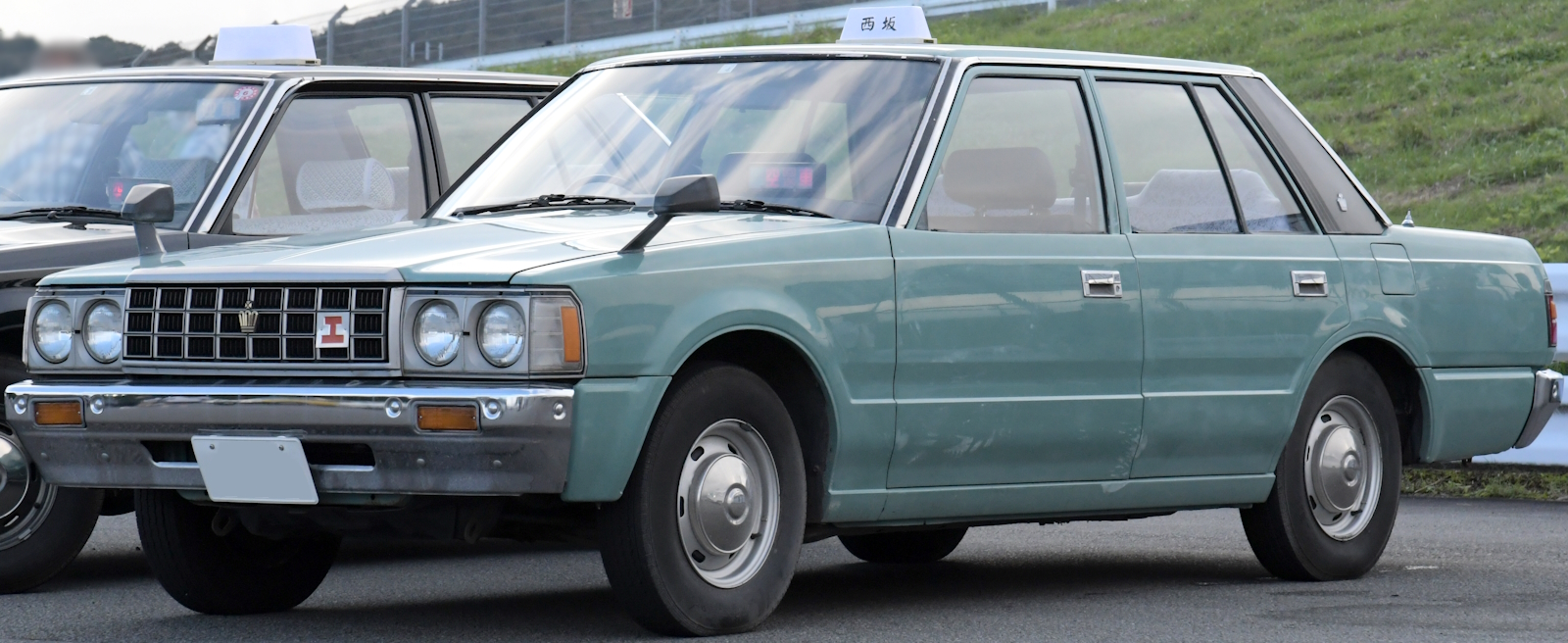
Toyota Crown Standard sedan with round headlights (Japan)

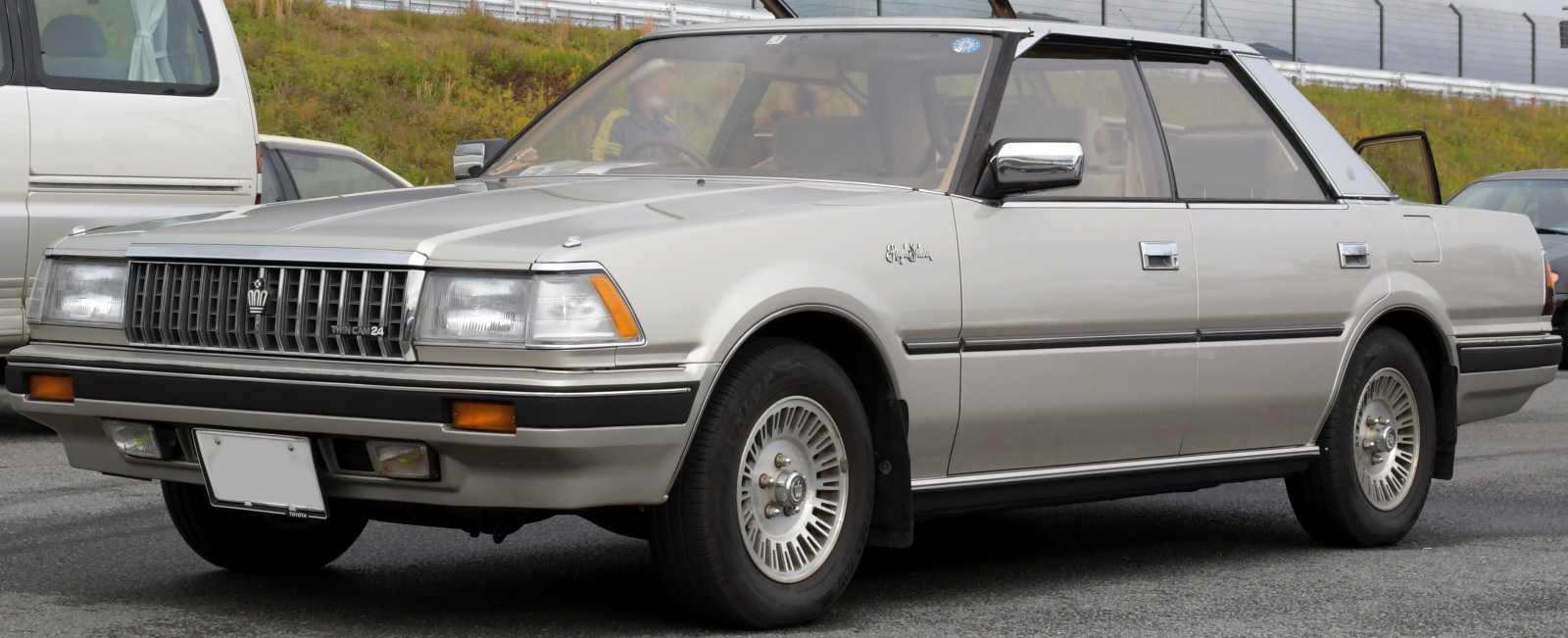
Crown Hardtop 2.0 Royal Saloon (GS121, Japan)

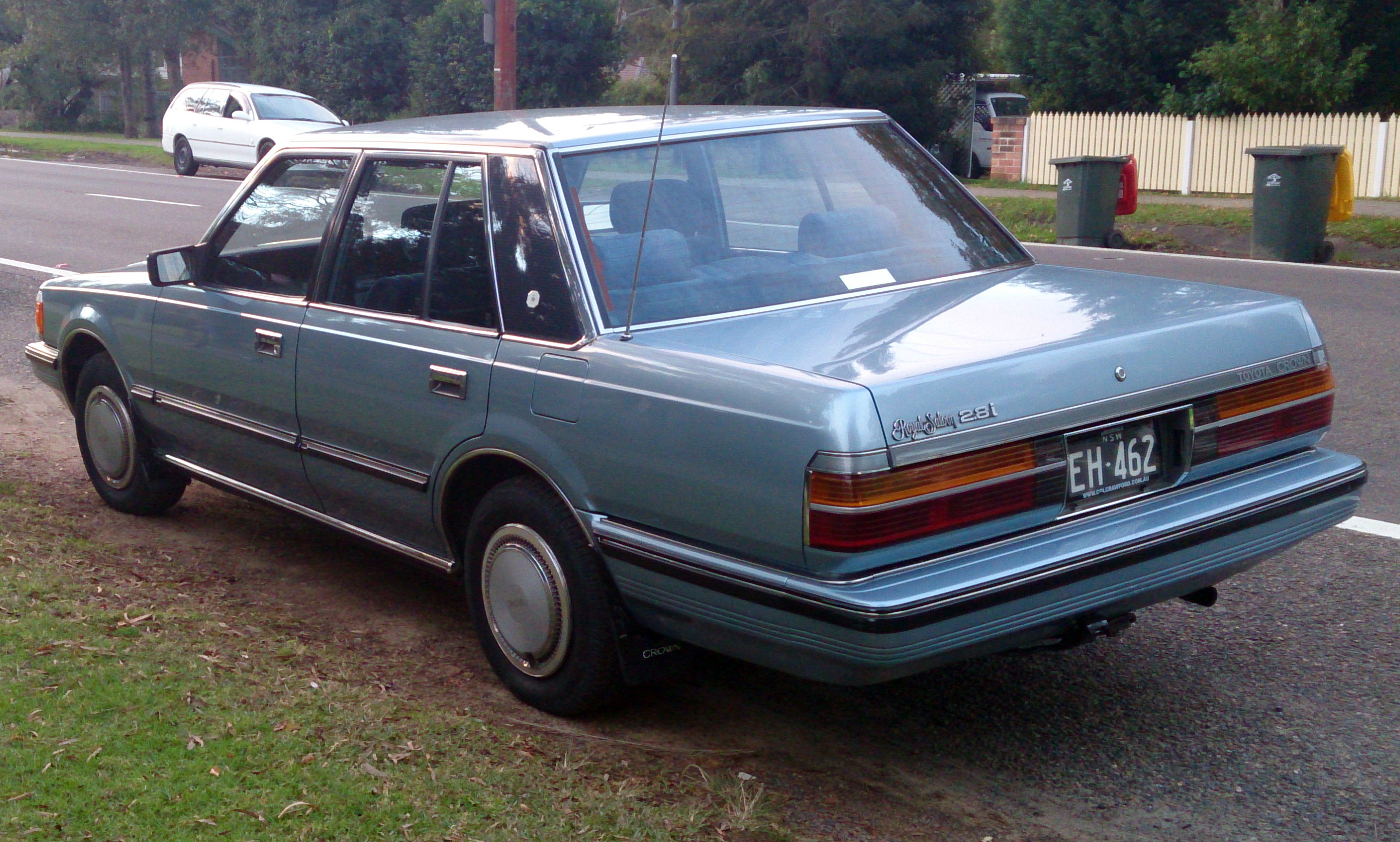
Rear of a 1984 Crown Royal Saloon 2.8i (MS122, Australia)

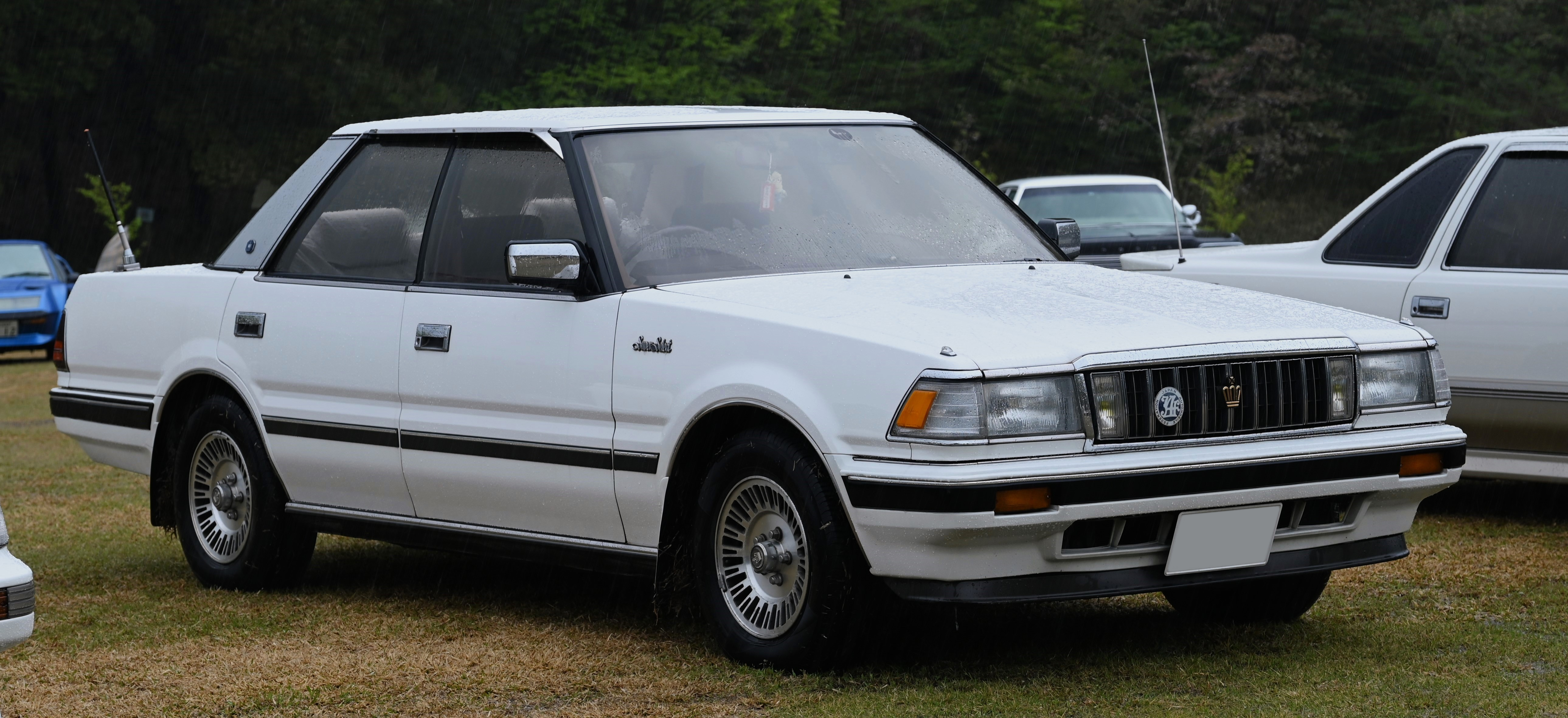
1985 Toyota Crown Hardtop Super Select (facelift)

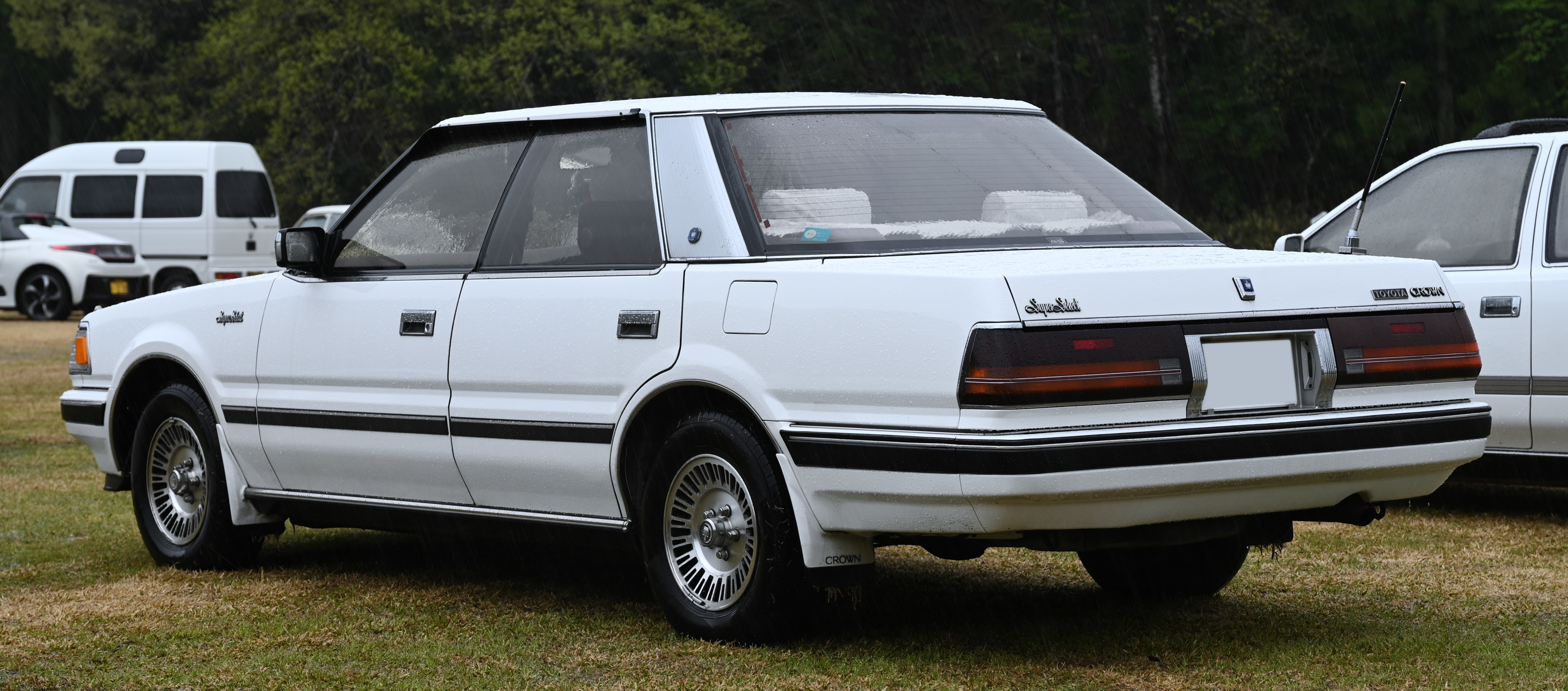
1985 Crown Hardtop Super Select (facelift; rear view)

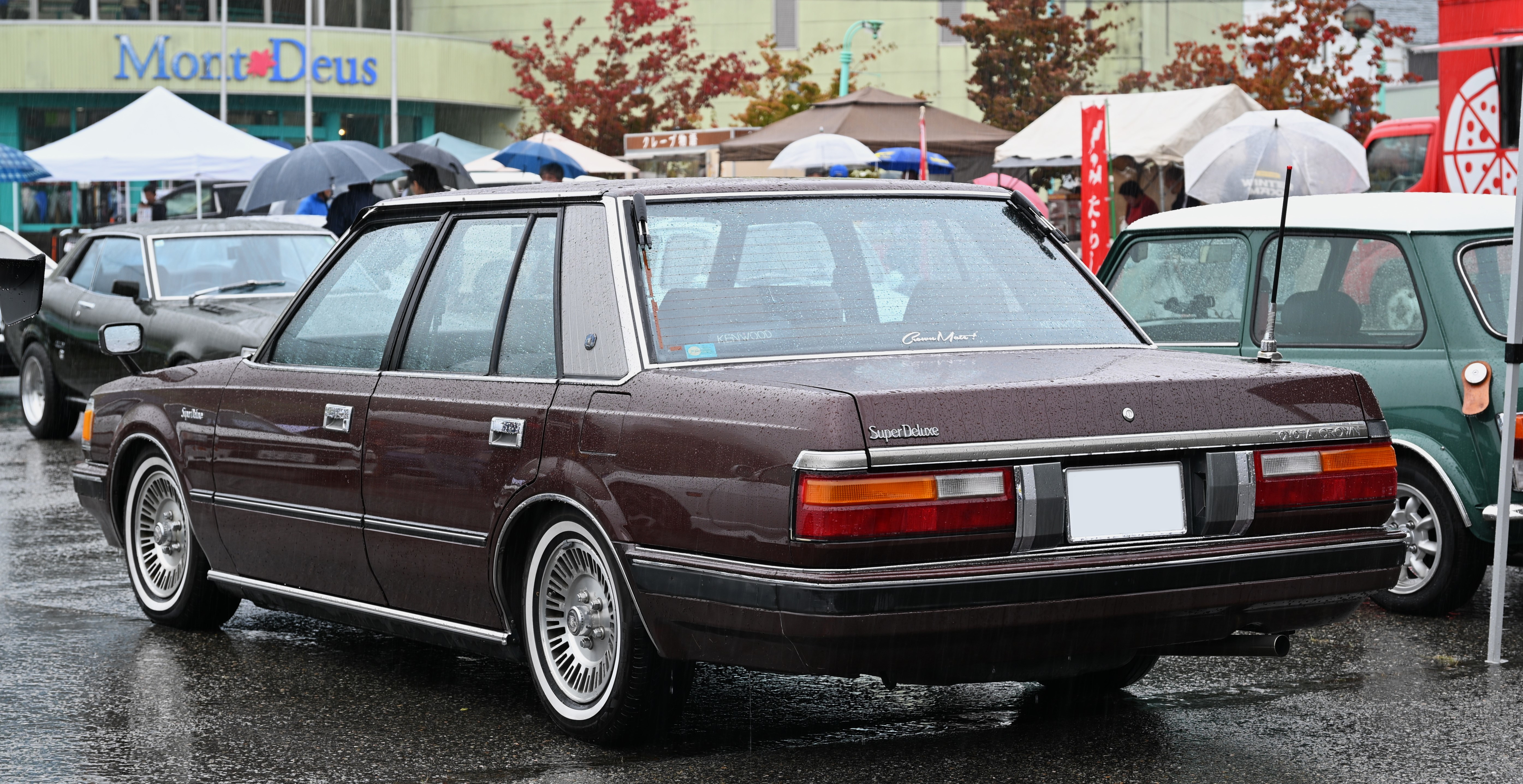
Crown Super Deluxe Sedan (facelift; Japan)

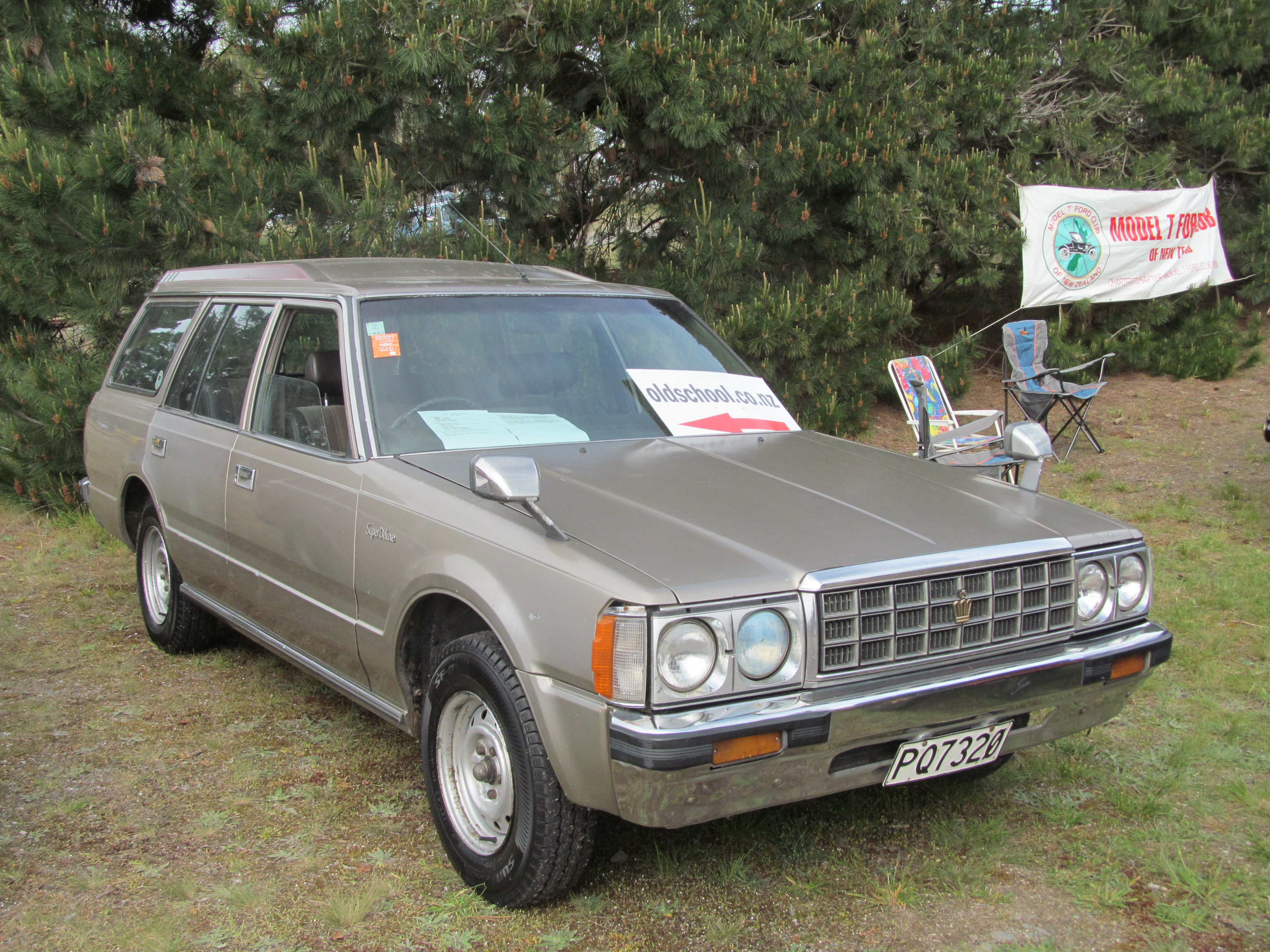
Crown Super Deluxe Van (New Zealand)

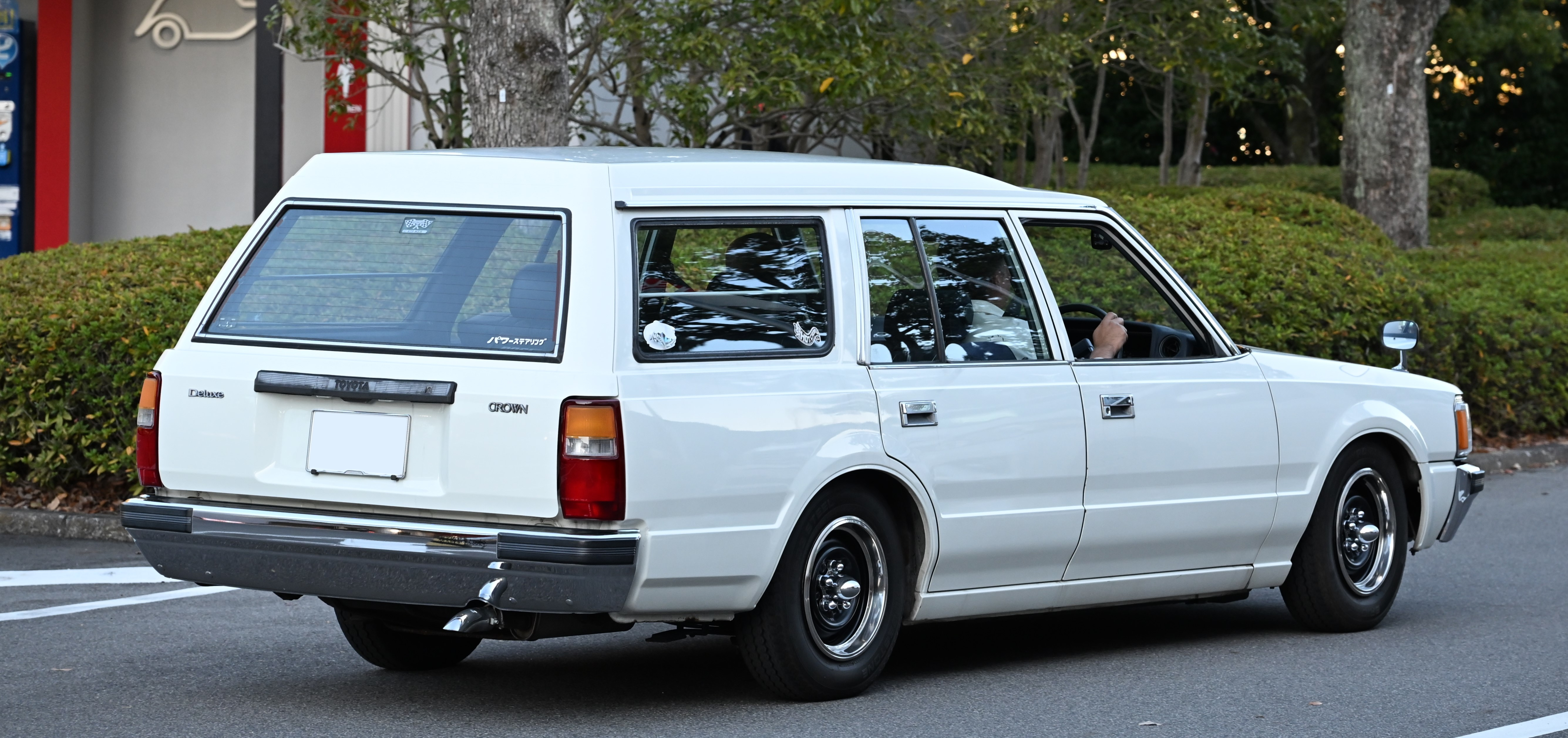
Crown Super Deluxe Van (rear view; with a non standard wheels)

== Eighth generation (S130; 1987) ==
Eighth generation
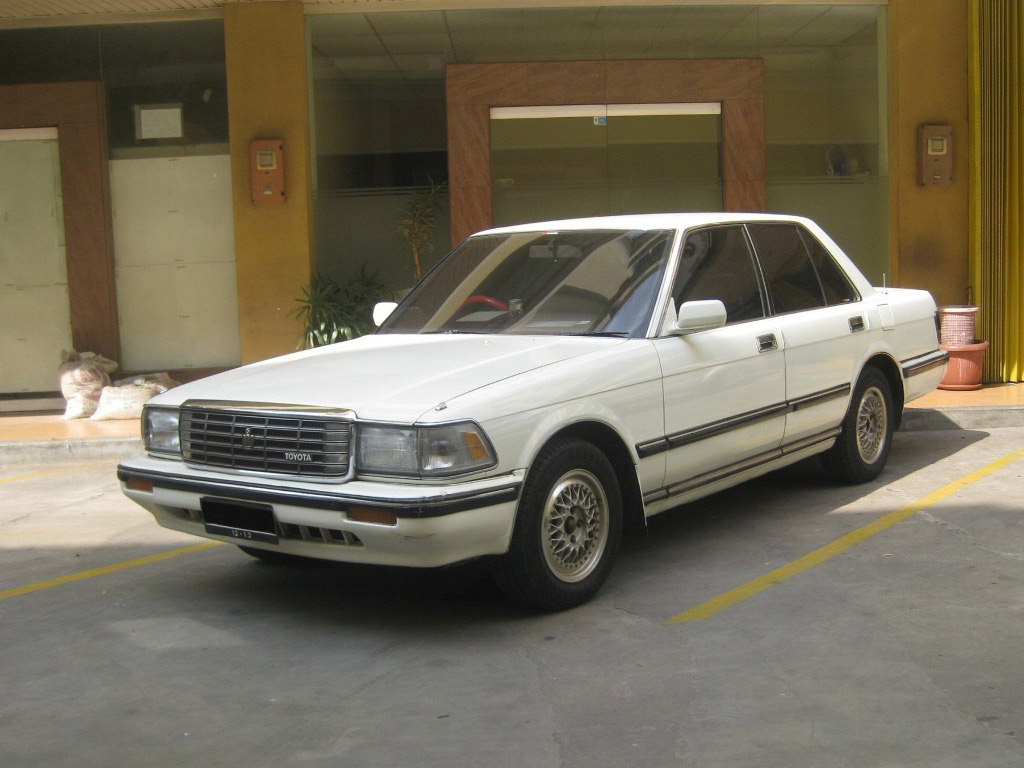
- Pre-facelift Toyota Crown 2.0i Super Saloon (GS131, Indonesia)

Overview
- Model code: S130
- Also called: Saibeijian Crown (China); Great Wall CC1020S (China)
- Production: 1987–1991 (pillared hardtop sedan); 1987–2000 (sedan); 1987–1999 (wagon/commercial van)

Body and chassis
- Body style: 4-door sedan; 4-door hardtop sedan; 5-door station wagon/van
- Layout: Front-engine, rear-wheel-drive

Powertrain
- Engine: Gasoline: 1988 cc 1G-E I6 (GS130/131/136V); 1988 cc 1G-FE I6 (GS130/131/136V); 1988 cc 1G-GE I6 (GS131); 1988 cc 1G-GZE supercharger I6 (GS130G/131); 2237 cc 4Y I4 (YS132); 2492 cc 1JZ-GE I6 (JZS130G/131); 2759 cc 5M I6 (MS132); 2759 cc 5M-E I6 (MS133); 2954 cc 7M-GE I6 (MS135/137); 2997 cc 2JZ-GE I6 (JZS133/135); 3968 cc 1UZ-FE V8 (UZS131); LPG; 1998 cc 3Y-P/PE I4 (YS130); 1988 cc M-P I6 (MS130); 1988 cc 1G-GP I6 (GS130); Diesel; 2446 cc 2L I4 (LS130/136V); 2446 cc 2L-T/TE/THE turbo-diesel I4 (LS130/131)
- Transmission: 4-speed manual; 5-speed manual; 4-speed automatic

Dimensions
- Wheelbase: 2,730 mm (107.5 in)
- Length: 4,690 mm (184.6 in) (narrow-body); 4,800 mm (189.0 in) (wide-body); 4,860 mm (191.3 in) (Royal Saloon G)
- Width: 1,695 mm (66.7 in) (narrow-body); 1,720–1,750 mm (67.7–68.9 in) (wide-body)
- Height: 1,400–1,450 mm (55.1–57.1 in) (sedan/hardtop); 1,515–1,550 mm (59.6–61.0 in) (wagon/van)
- Curb weight: 1,330–1,690 kg (2,932–3,726 lb)

Chronology
- Successor: Toyota Crown Majesta (for Royal Saloon G)

Launched in 1987, it came in sedan, hardtop, and wagon body styles, including a van model for commercial uses. This model used the 7M-GE 3000 cc DOHC, 1G-GZE 2000 cc DOHC supercharger, 1G-GE 2000 cc DOHC, 1G-E 2000 cc, 2L-THE 2400 cc SOHC Turbo Diesel Hi-Power (automatics), 2L-TE 2400 cc SOHC Turbo Diesel (with manual transmission) or 2L 2400 cc SOHC naturally aspirated diesel engine. The 4.0-liter 1UZ-FE, the same engine as in Lexus LS400, later became available in the Royal Saloon G, which became the Toyota Crown Majesta with the next generation Crown. The air suspension-equipped Royal Saloon G was also available with the 3-liter inline-six engines and used double wishbone control arms to accommodate the airbags. Due to the different suspension, the Royal Saloon G carries a different model code (MS137 versus MS135 for the coil-sprung models). The better-equipped models receive an independent semi-trailing arm rear suspension, while the simpler versions (including all wagons and vans) have live rear axles located by trailing links. These versions receive different chassis numbers (GS130 versus GS131, for instance).

In 1988, it became the first Toyota available with an airbag.

Although a totally different chassis and body, the S130 shares styling cues with the X80 Cressida. In 1989, the top-level Royal Saloon G introduced the world's first CD-ROM-based automotive navigation system, with color CRT display. Also, TRC traction control and electronically controlled shock absorbers called TEMS (shared with the first generation Toyota Soarer) were adopted. This Crown was sold only in Japan, the Middle East, the Caribbean, and select Asian markets. Some export markets received the older 2.8 liter SOHC inline-six, either carbureted or fuel injected. For general countries, only with left-hand drive and a four-speed manual transmission, the 2.2-liter inline-four 4Y engine was also available.

In September 1988, a narrow-angle twin-cam version of the two-liter inline-six engine (the 1G-FE) replaced the two-valve 1G-E in most applications, although the lower cost model continued to be available in commercial models until September 1989. In August 1989, the Crown received a light facelift, with more aerodynamic design front and rear, incorporating new bumpers. This was also when the 4-liter V8-engined Royal Saloon G was introduced, using the same engine which was to appear in the Lexus LS400 within a month. The LPG-powered M engine was replaced with the more powerful 1G-GP version at the same time, while the four-cylinder 3Y engine received fuel injection.

In August 1990, a version of the supercharged 2.0 model fitted with the bigger body of the 3.0 was added to the lineup (GS131H). This car was placed in a much higher tax bracket than the narrower-bodied versions. Such cars have different license plates than more compact cars and are therefore considered prestigious, if expensive. This was also when the new 2.5-liter 1JZ-GE engine was introduced as the 2500 Royal Saloon, available as a Sedan, Hardtop, or Wagon, replacing the earlier 2-liter Royal Saloon model. A few LPG-powered models were also available for commercial uses, using two-liter engines with either four or six cylinders. In October 1991, a large-bodied variant of the turbodiesel sedan was presented.

Station wagons were considered separate from the commercial van models in Japan. They were originally equipped with the 2-liter 1G-FE six, or as a supercharged "Royal Saloon" wagon. The 2.4 turbodiesel was also available. As of August 1990, the 2.5-liter 1JZ-FE was also made available in the station wagon lineup.

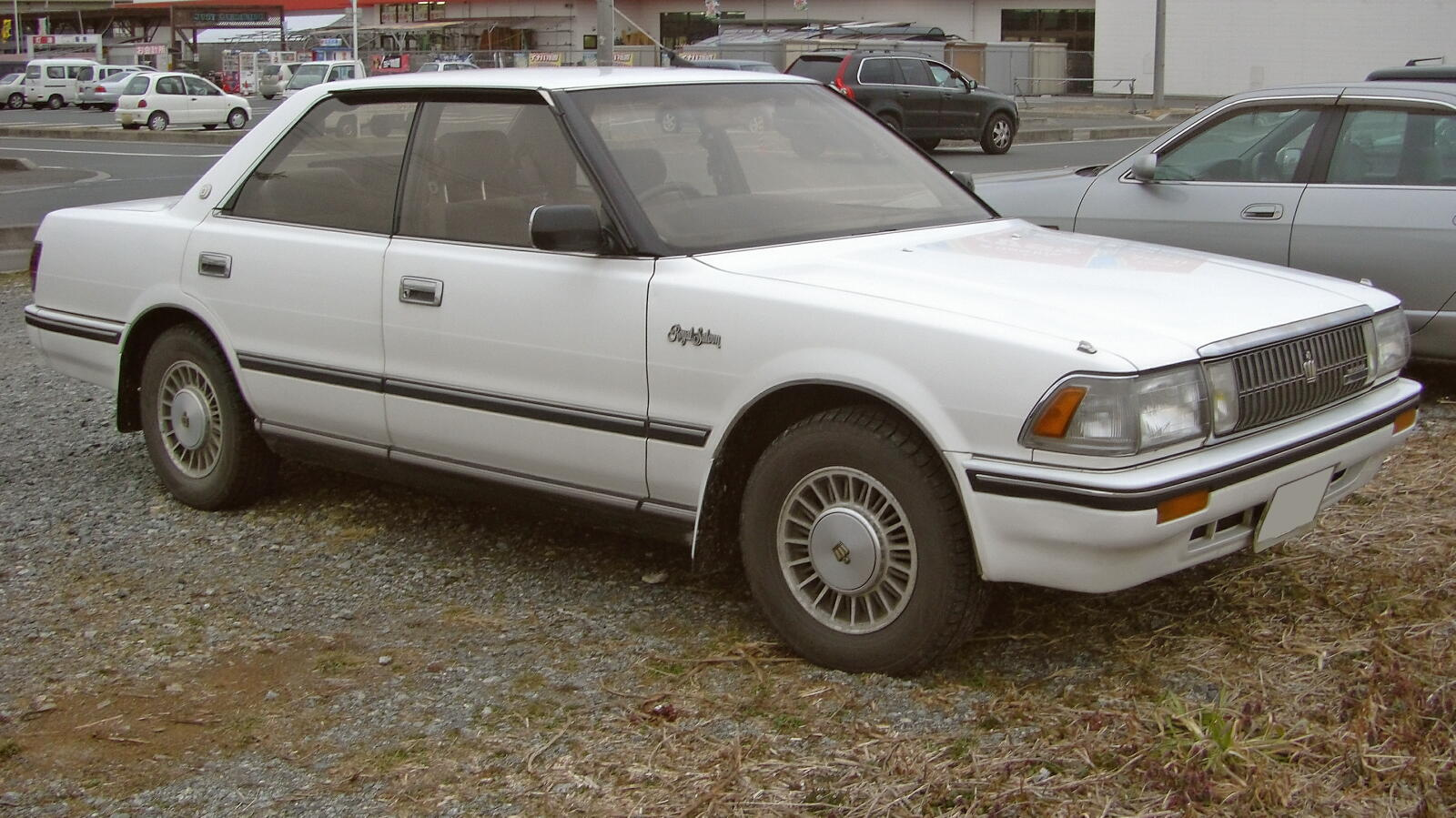
Toyota Crown Hardtop Royal Saloon (Japan)

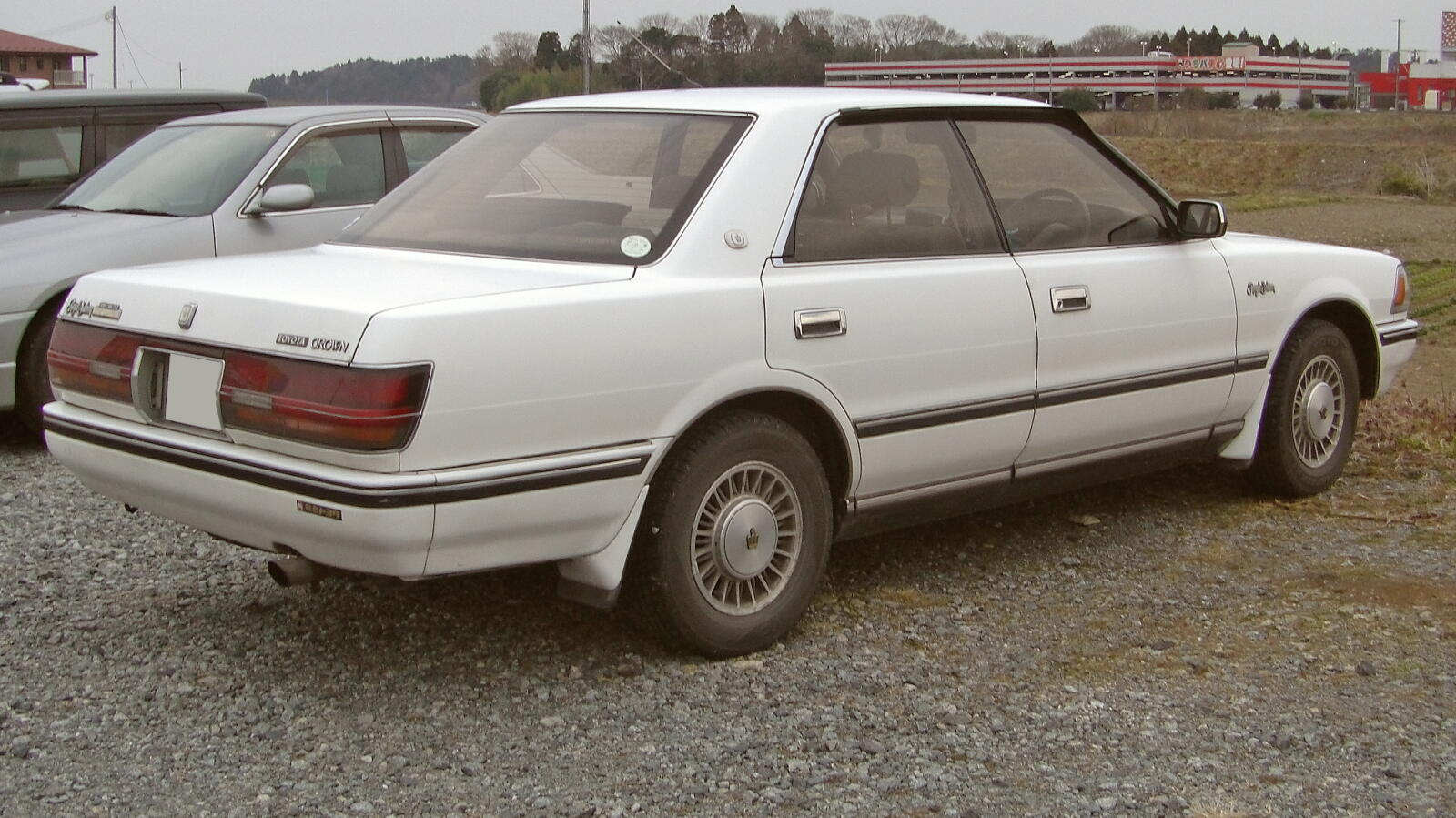
Toyota Crown Hardtop Royal Saloon (Japan)

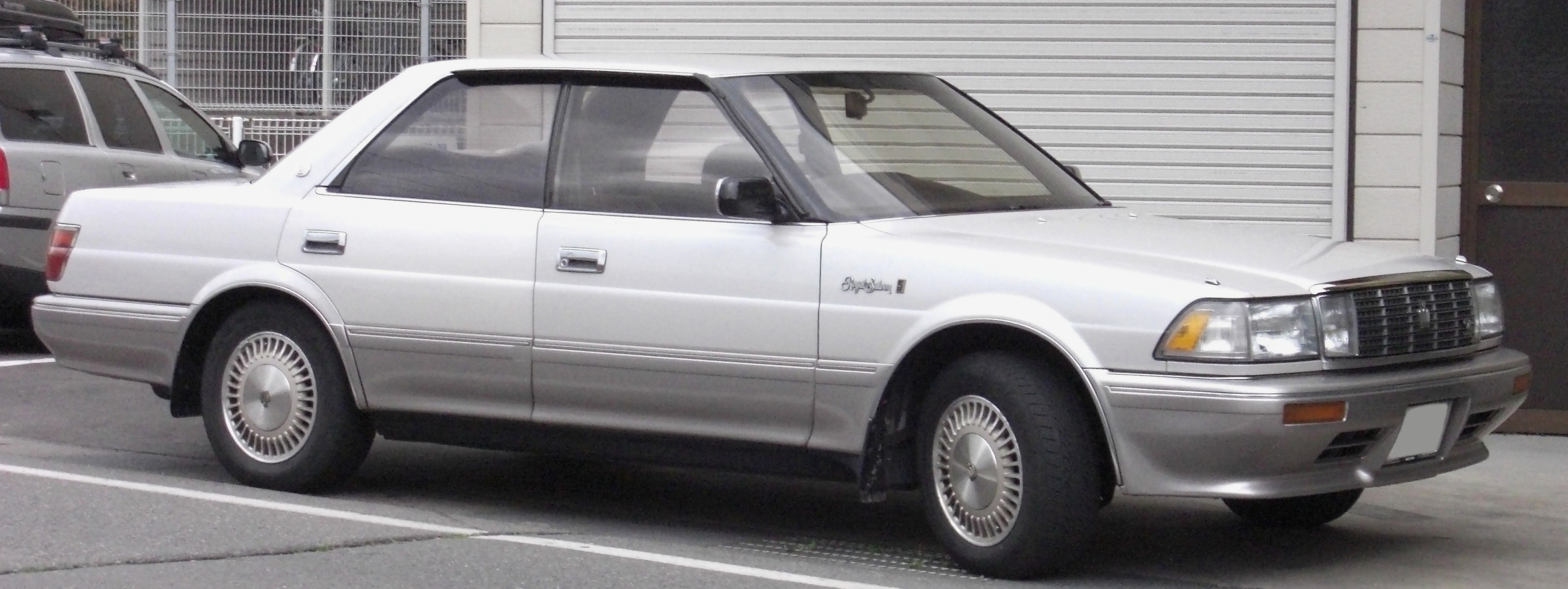
Toyota Crown Hardtop Royal Saloon G V8 (UZS131, Japan)

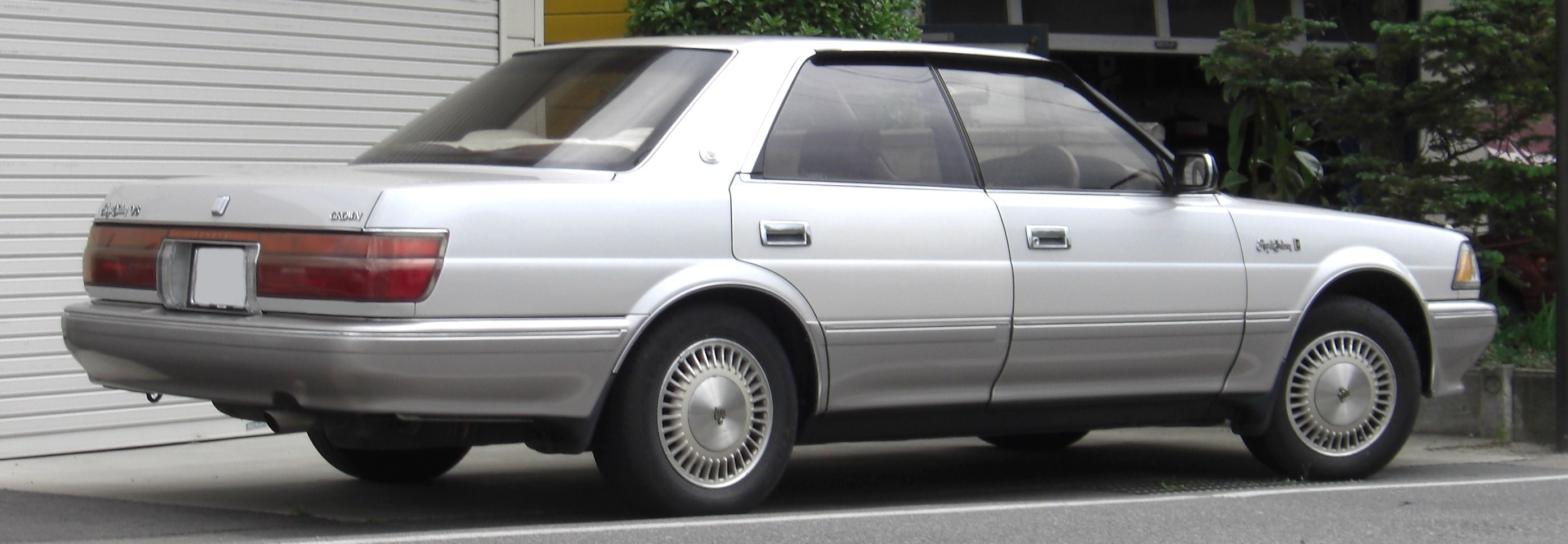
Toyota Crown Hardtop Royal Saloon G V8 (UZS131, Japan)

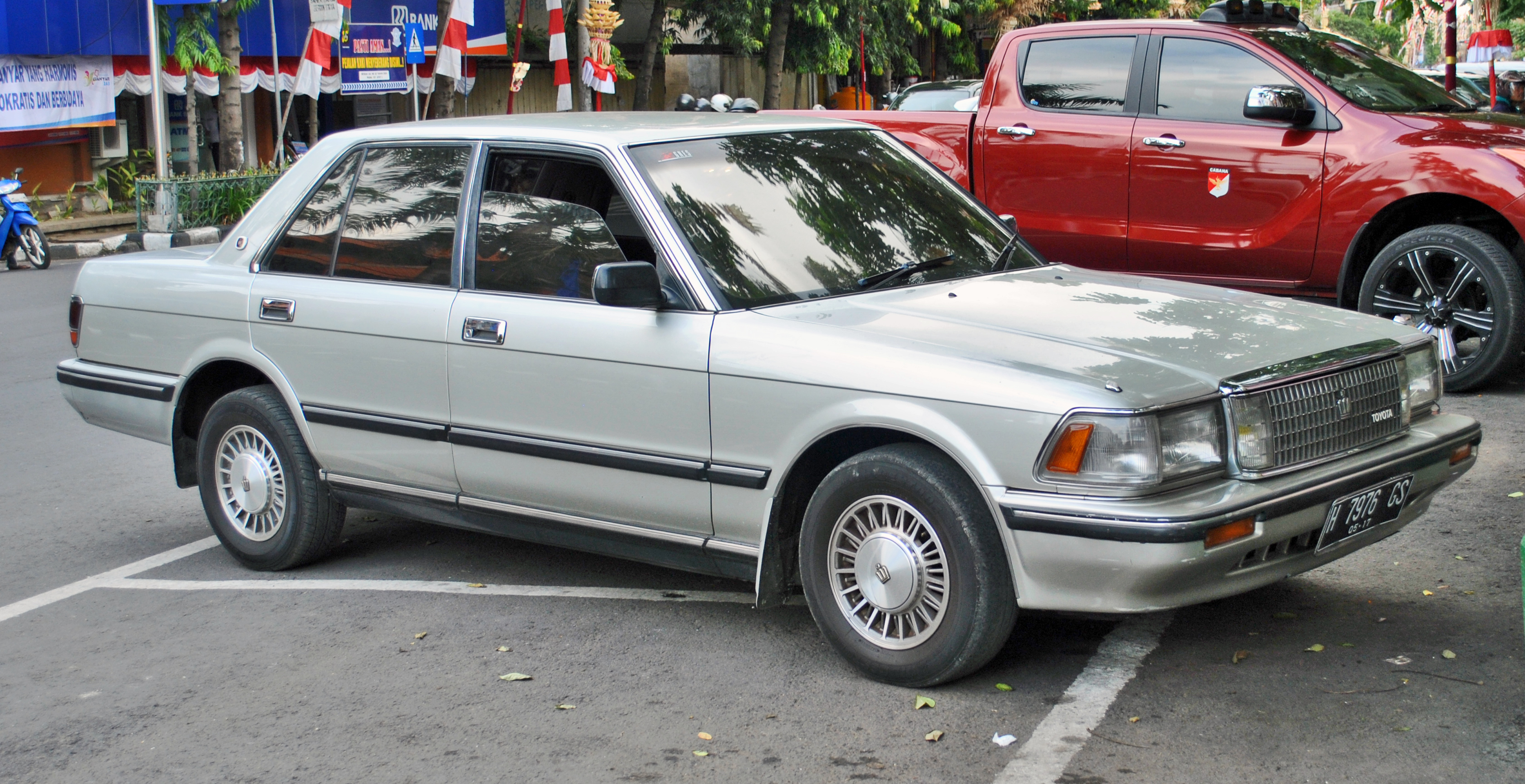
Toyota Crown Sedan 2.0i Royal Saloon (GS131, Indonesia)

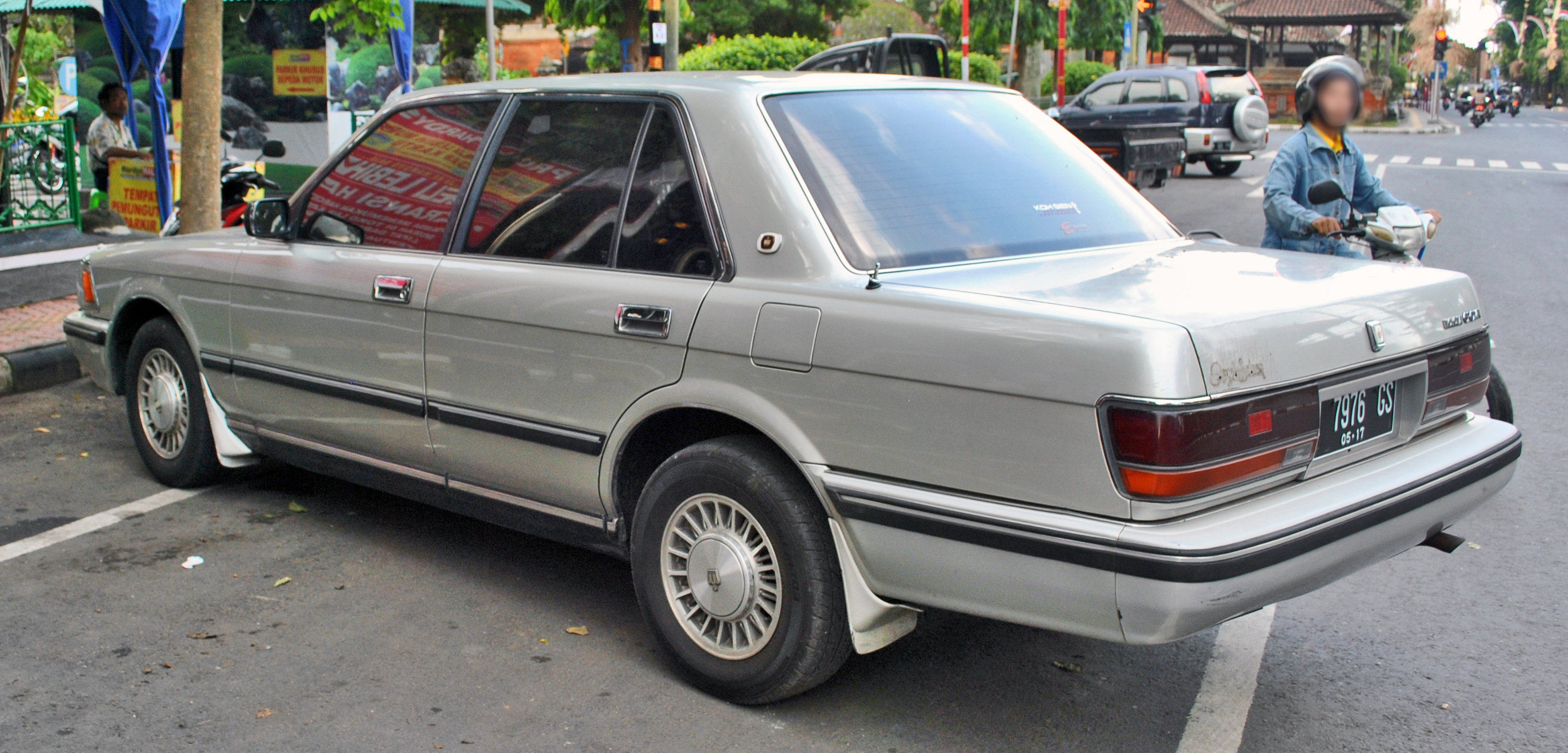
Toyota Crown Sedan 2.0i Royal Saloon (GS131, Indonesia)

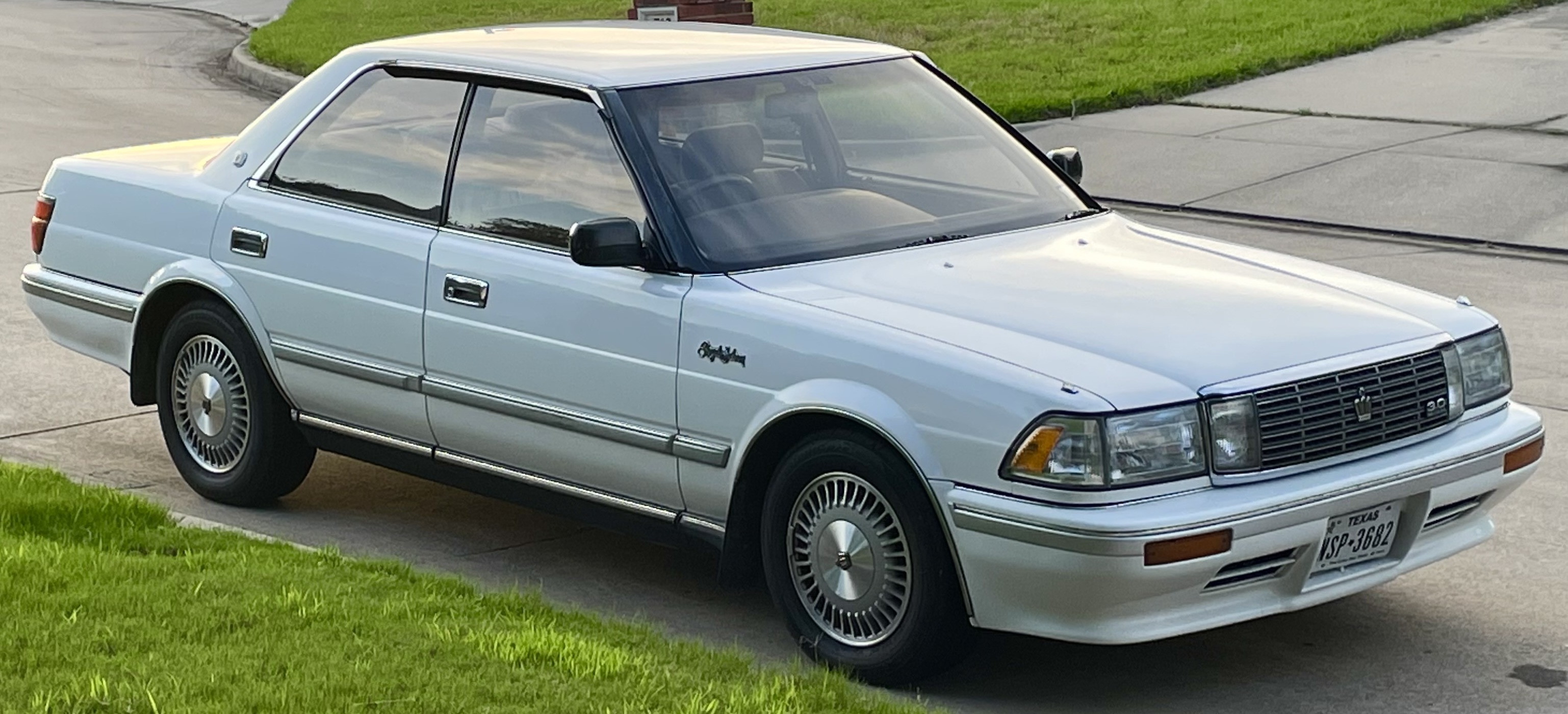
Crown Royal Saloon Hardtop (JZS131, Japan)

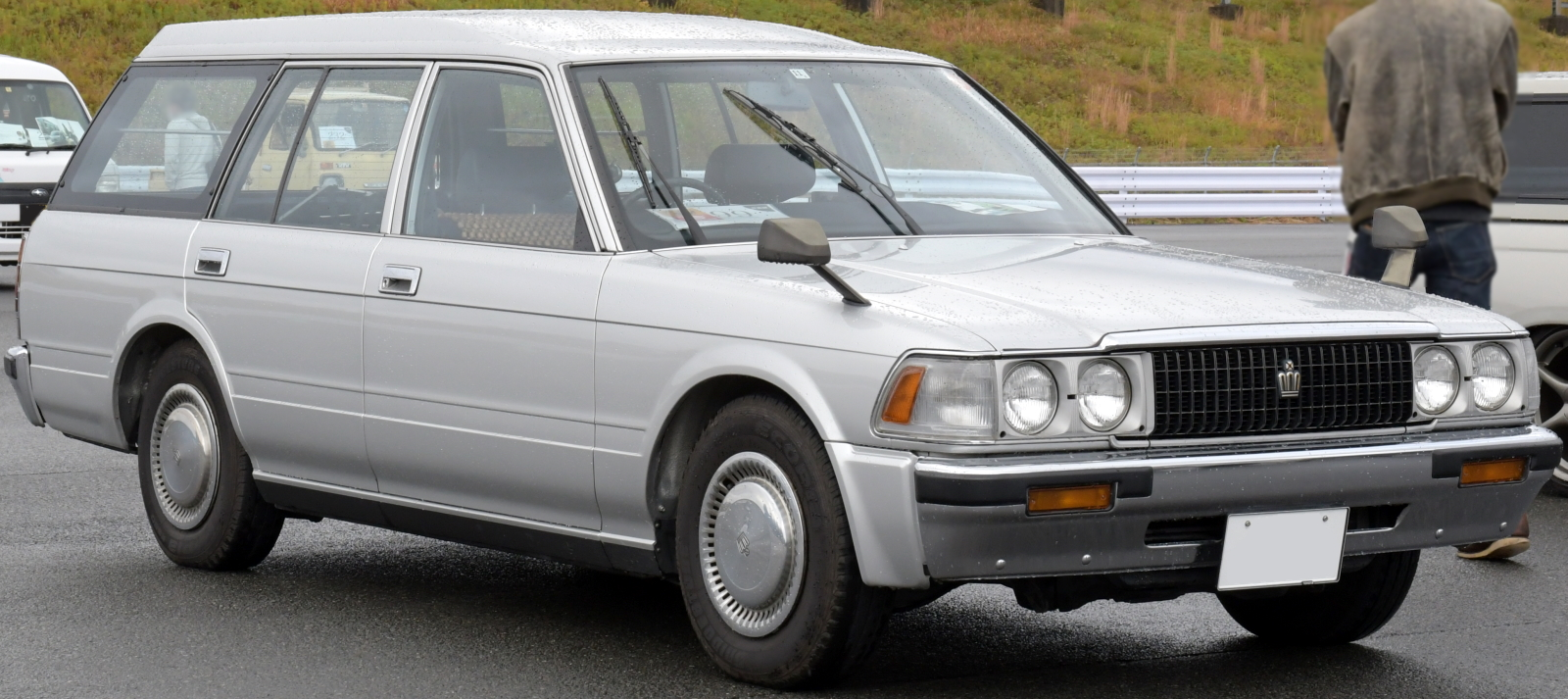
Toyota Crown Van Deluxe (GS136V, Japan)

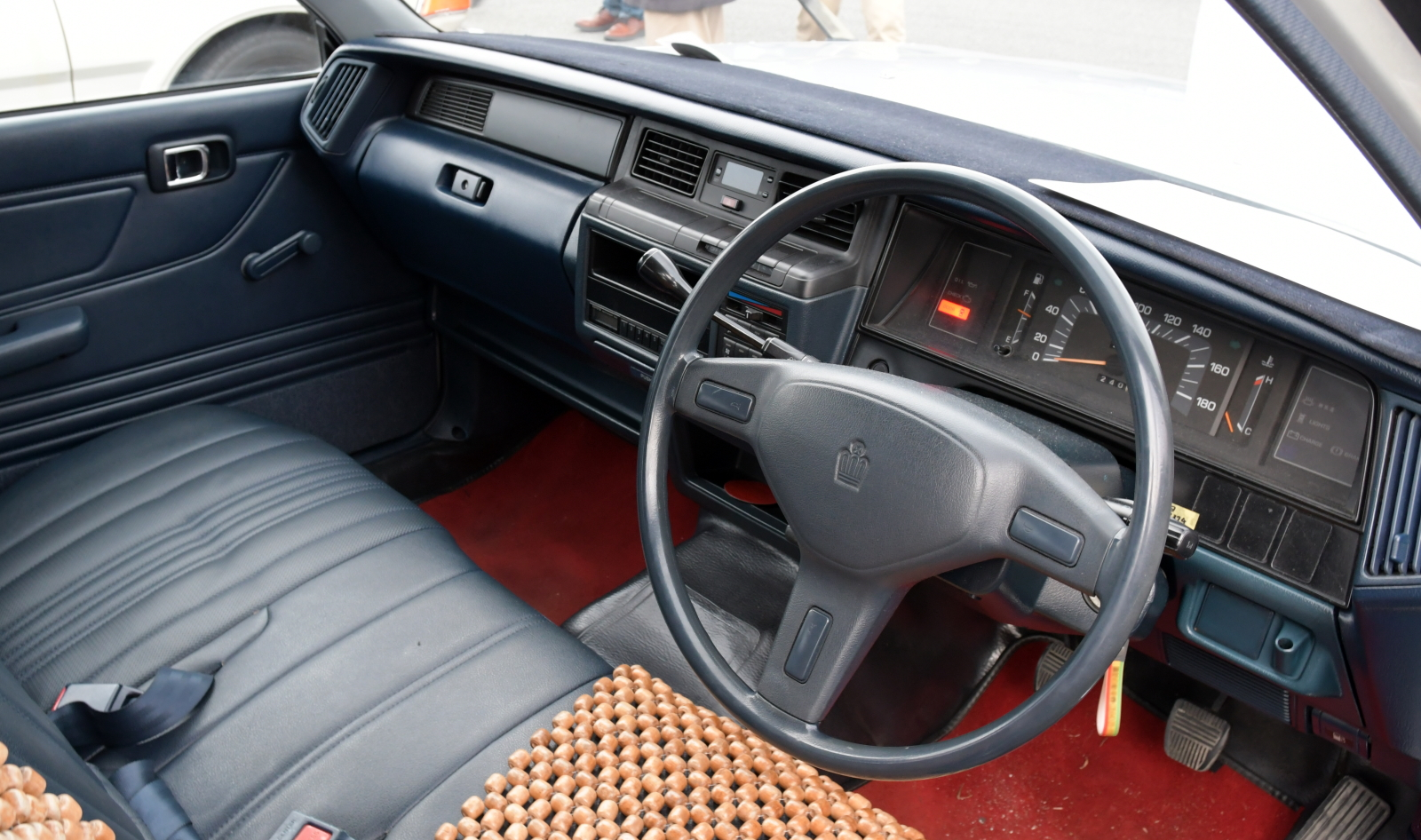
Interior

=== Facelift (1991–1999) ===
In August 1991, when the Crown hardtop was redesigned and became the S140 series, the Crown sedan and wagon and van were also restyled but retained the S130 model code. At this point the 1JZ-GE and 2JZ-GE engines replaced the M-series in-line-six engines for the Crown lineup, as well as some of the supercharged G-series models. The Standard Sedan for Taxi and base model Wagon feature round headlights and chrome bumpers. The taxi is powered by 2.4-liter diesel engine matched to 4-speed column-mounted manual transmission. In Hong Kong and Singapore, the Crown Sedan with the diesel engine was the most common vehicle used as taxis.

The Crown Royal Saloon, meanwhile, was an exclusive car. In October 1991, the supercharged model was discontinued. In December 1995, the sales of sedan model was stopped for the Japanese market. In September 1996, the 1JZ-GE 2.5-liter engine received VVT-i, which led to the power jumping from 180 to 200 PS (132 to 147 kW). The sales of the wagon and van were stopped in December 1999.

In 1993, Great Wall made unlicensed clones of the S130 under the name CC1020S. Great Wall also made a station wagon variant, known as CC6470, and a crew cab version which was known as CC1020S. A version with stretched station wagon bodywork set on the BJ212 "Jeep" chassis was also offered.

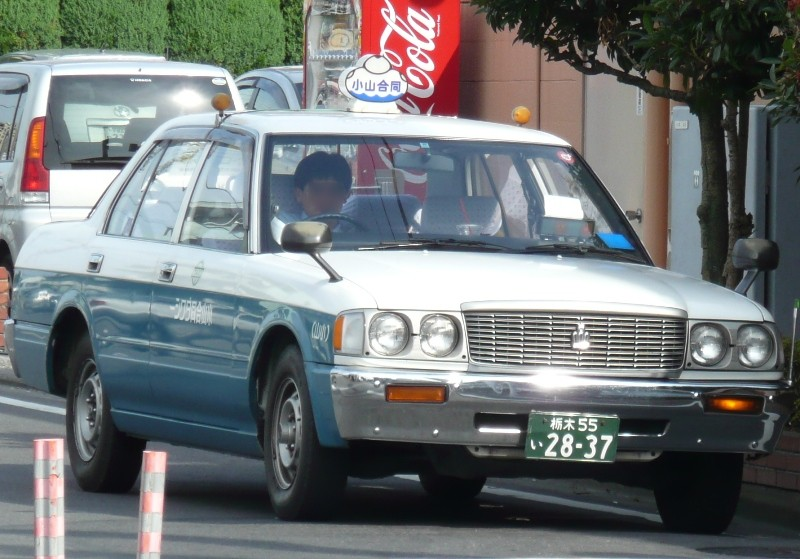
Facelift model Crown Sedan Diesel for Taxi (YS130) with round headlights.

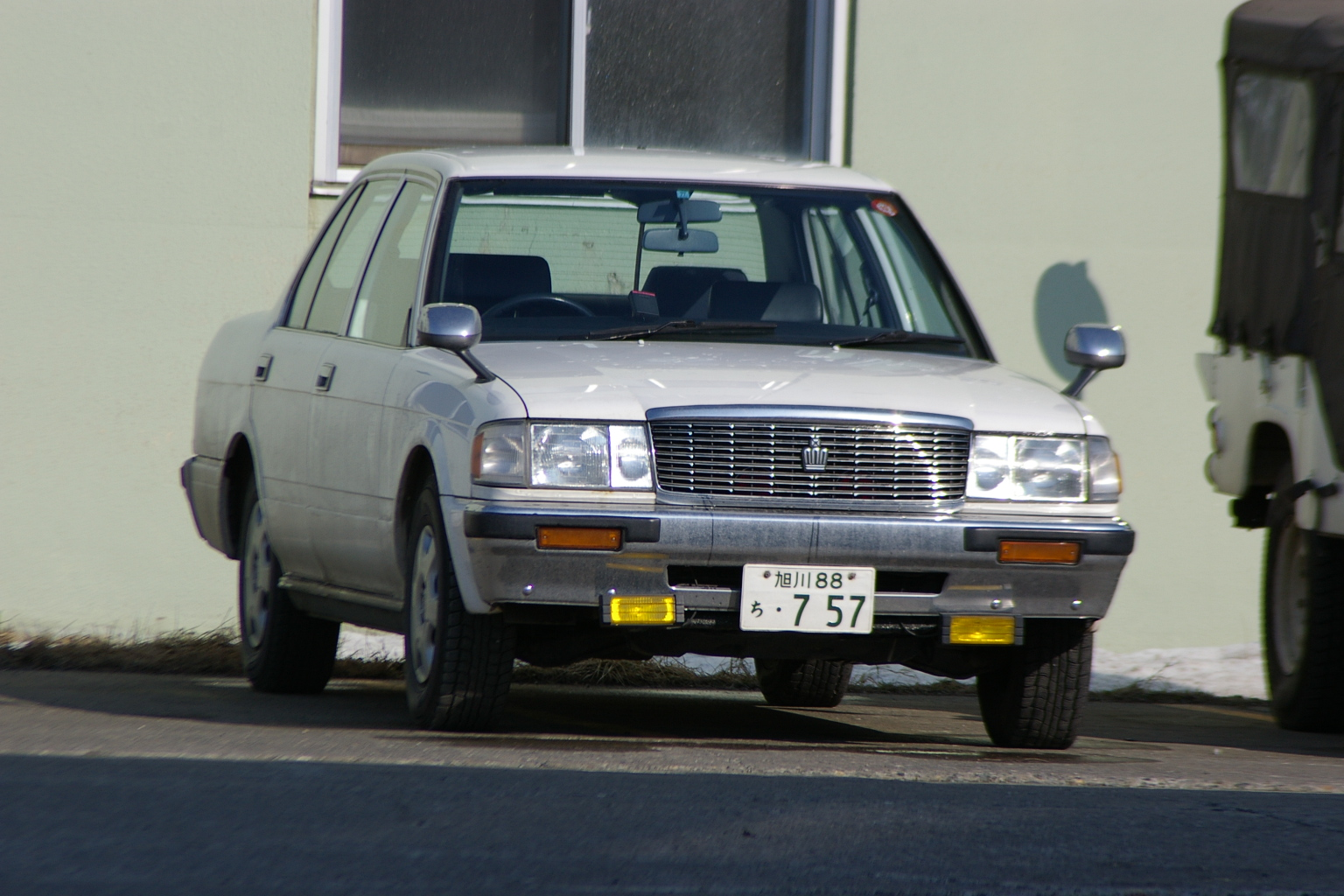
Toyota Crown Deluxe used by JGSDF

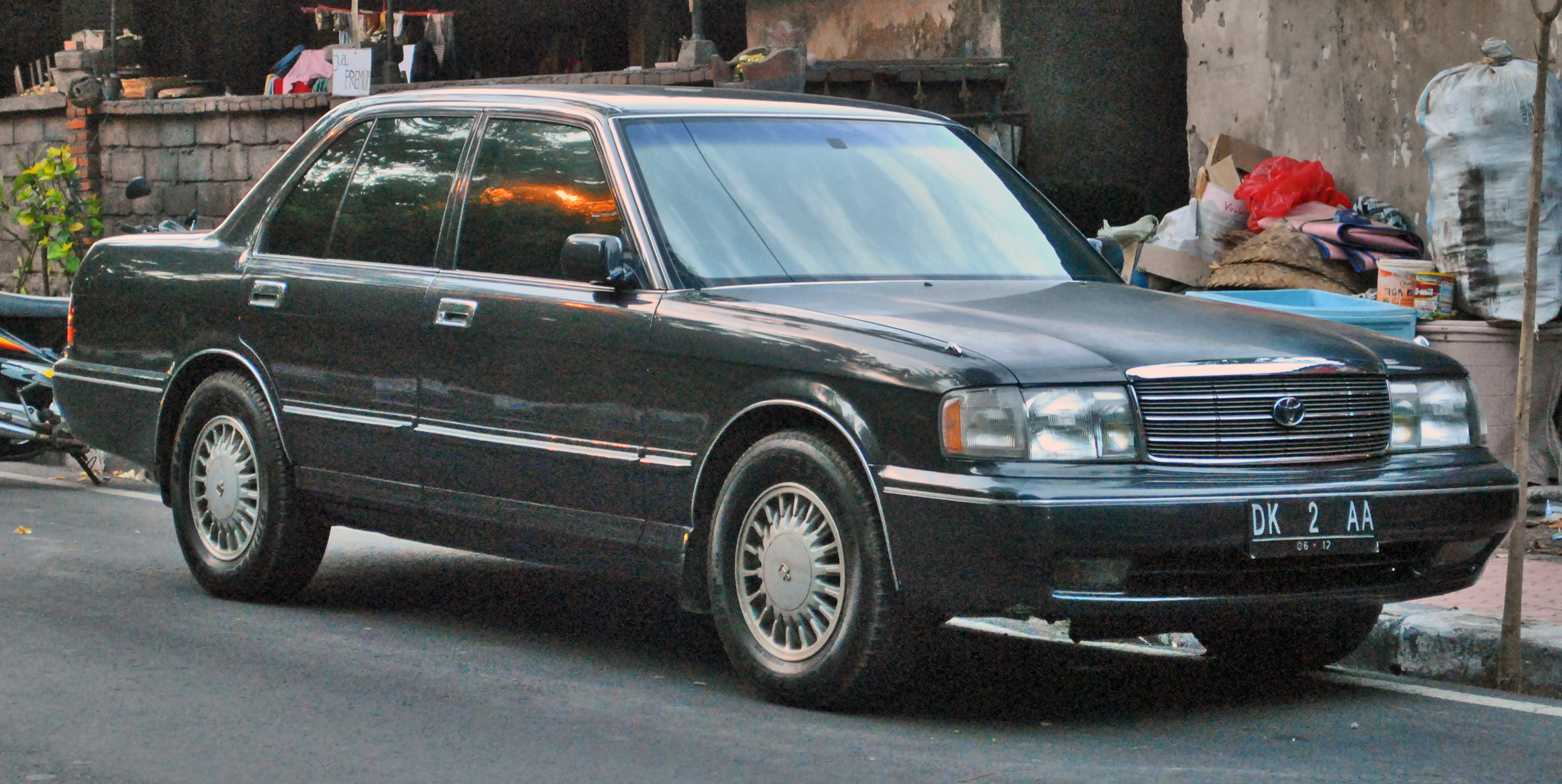
Toyota Crown Royal Saloon (JZS133, Indonesia), 3 stripes grille.

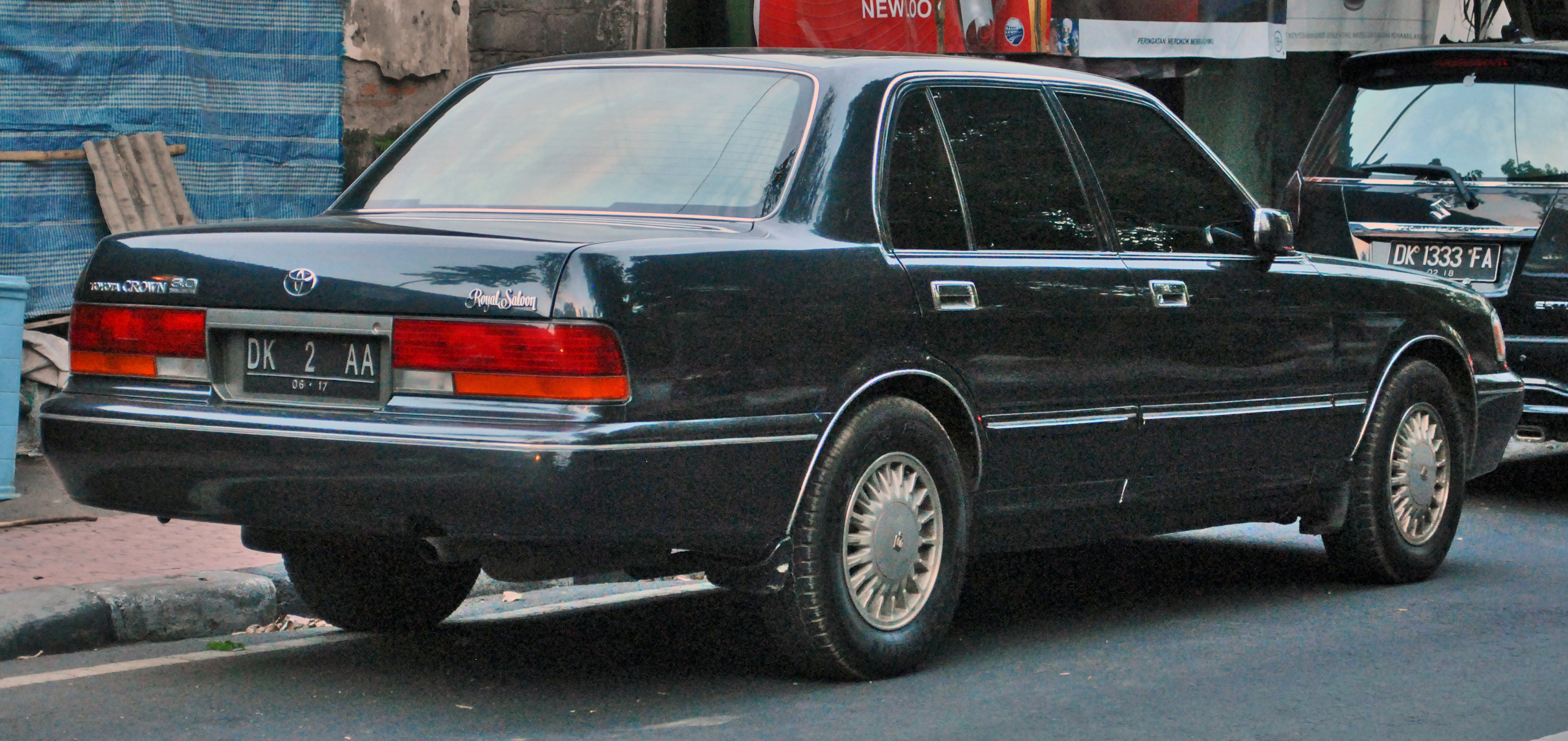
Toyota Crown 3.0 Royal Saloon (JZS133, Indonesia)

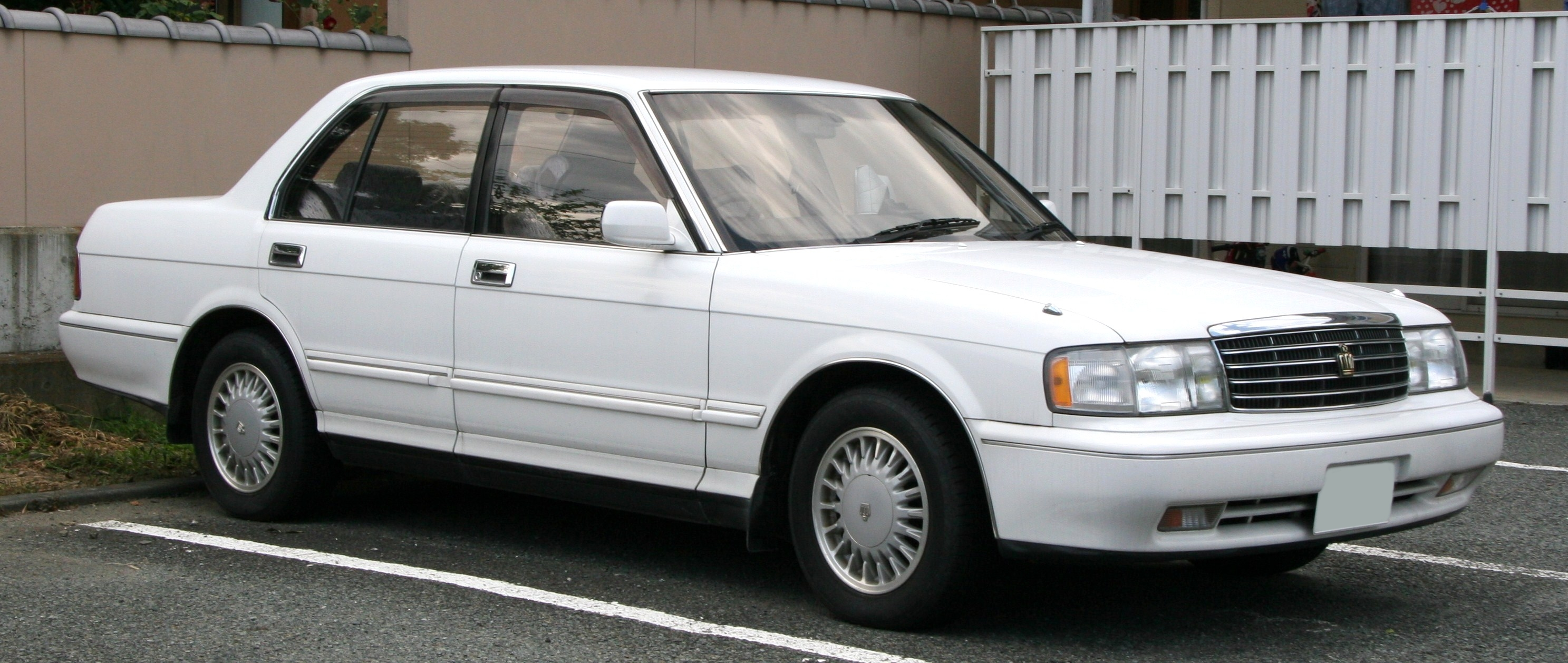
Toyota Crown Royal Saloon (Japan), 4 stripes grille.

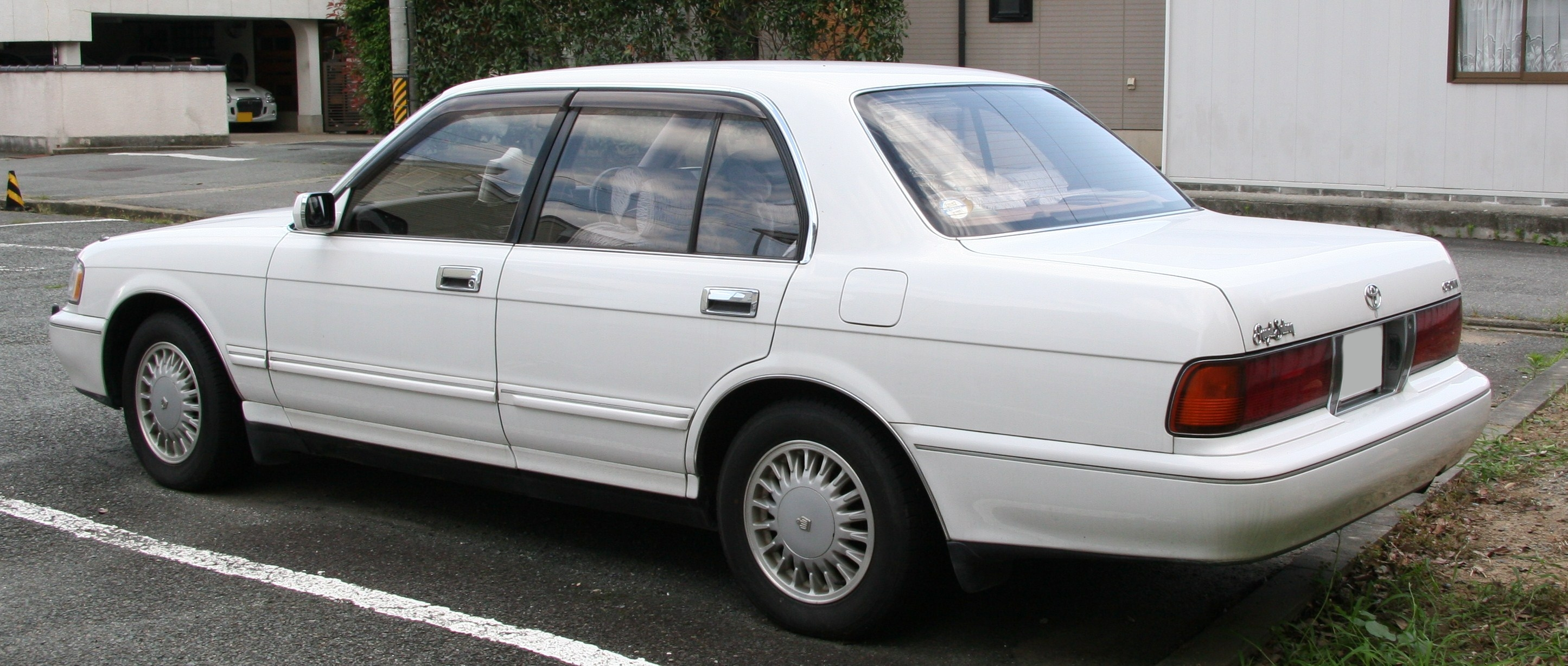
Toyota Crown Royal Saloon (Japan)

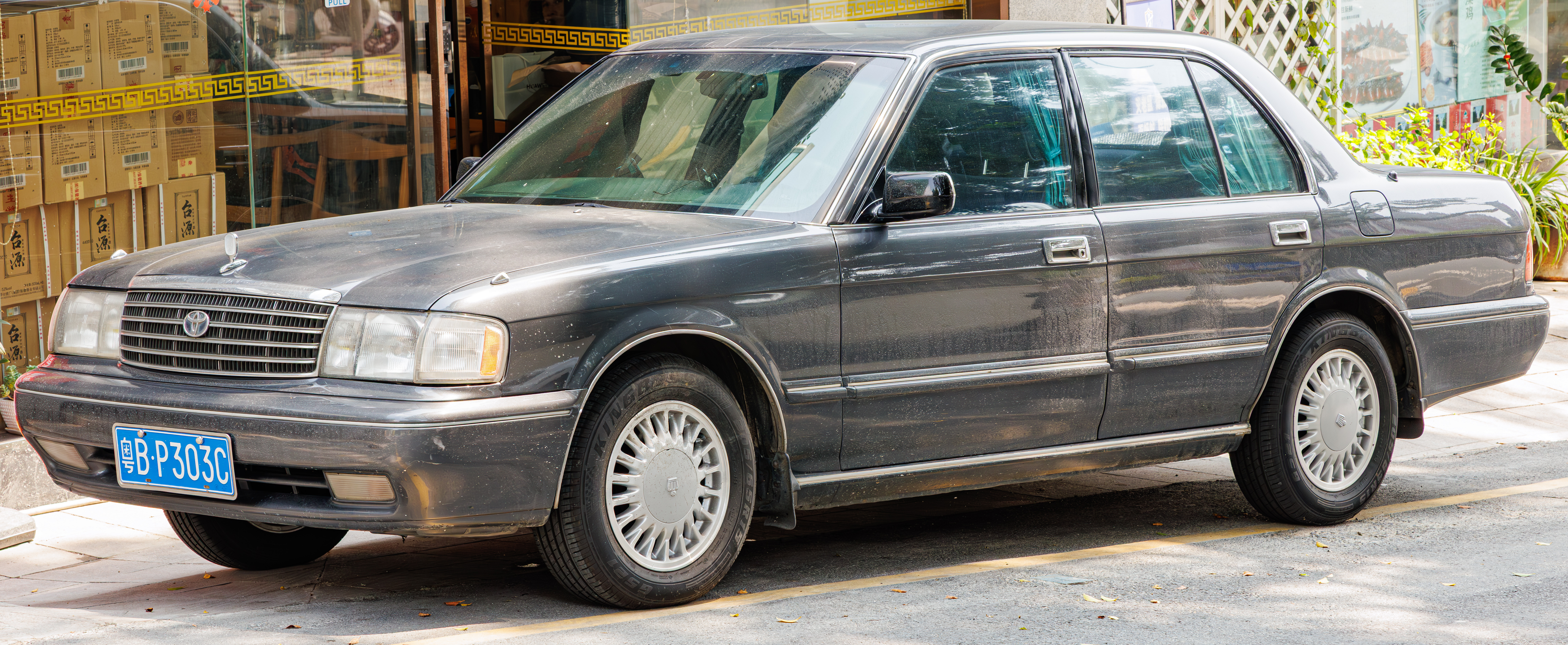
Toyota Crown 3.0 Royal Saloon (JZS133, China), 5 stripes grille.

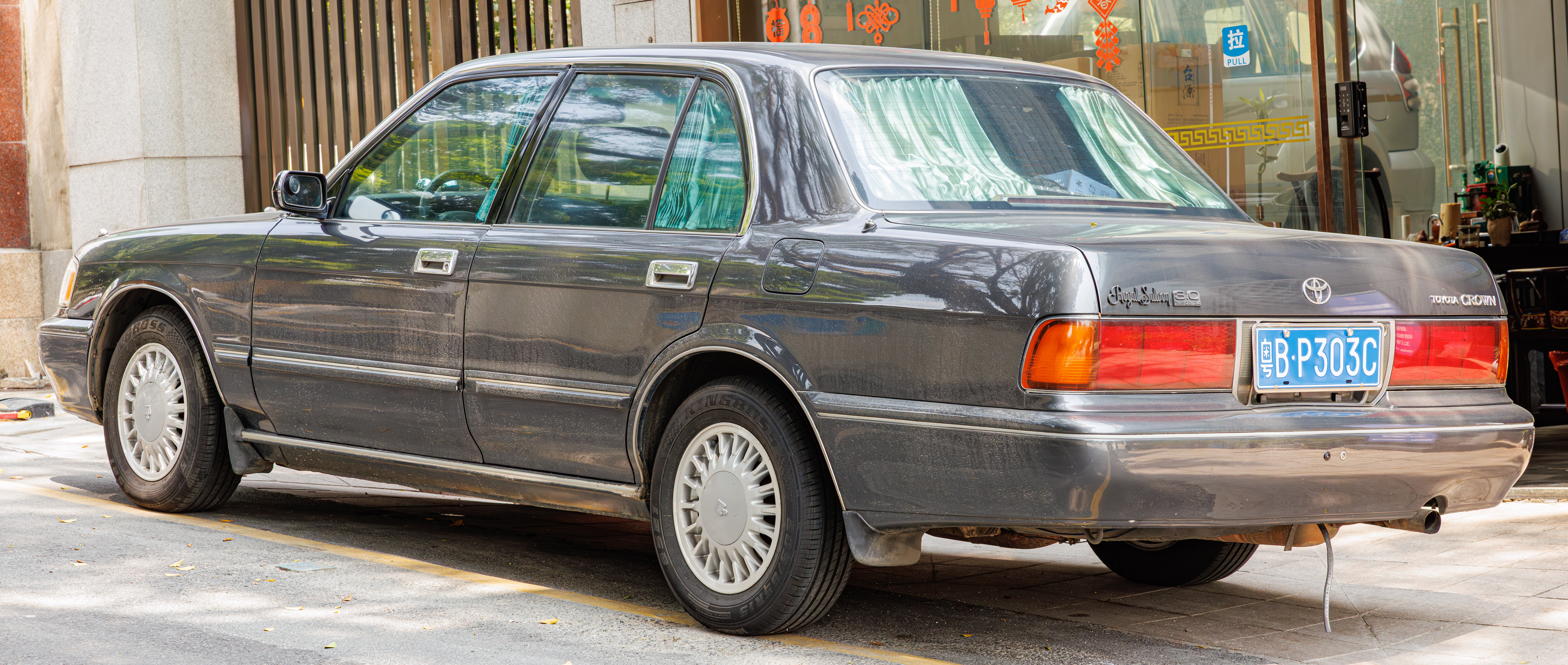
Toyota Crown 3.0 Royal Saloon (JZS133, China)

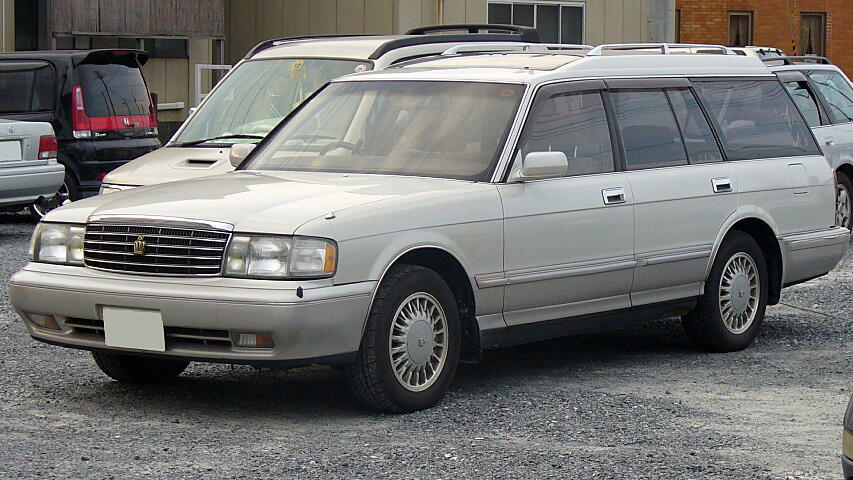
Toyota Crown Royal Saloon wagon (Japan)

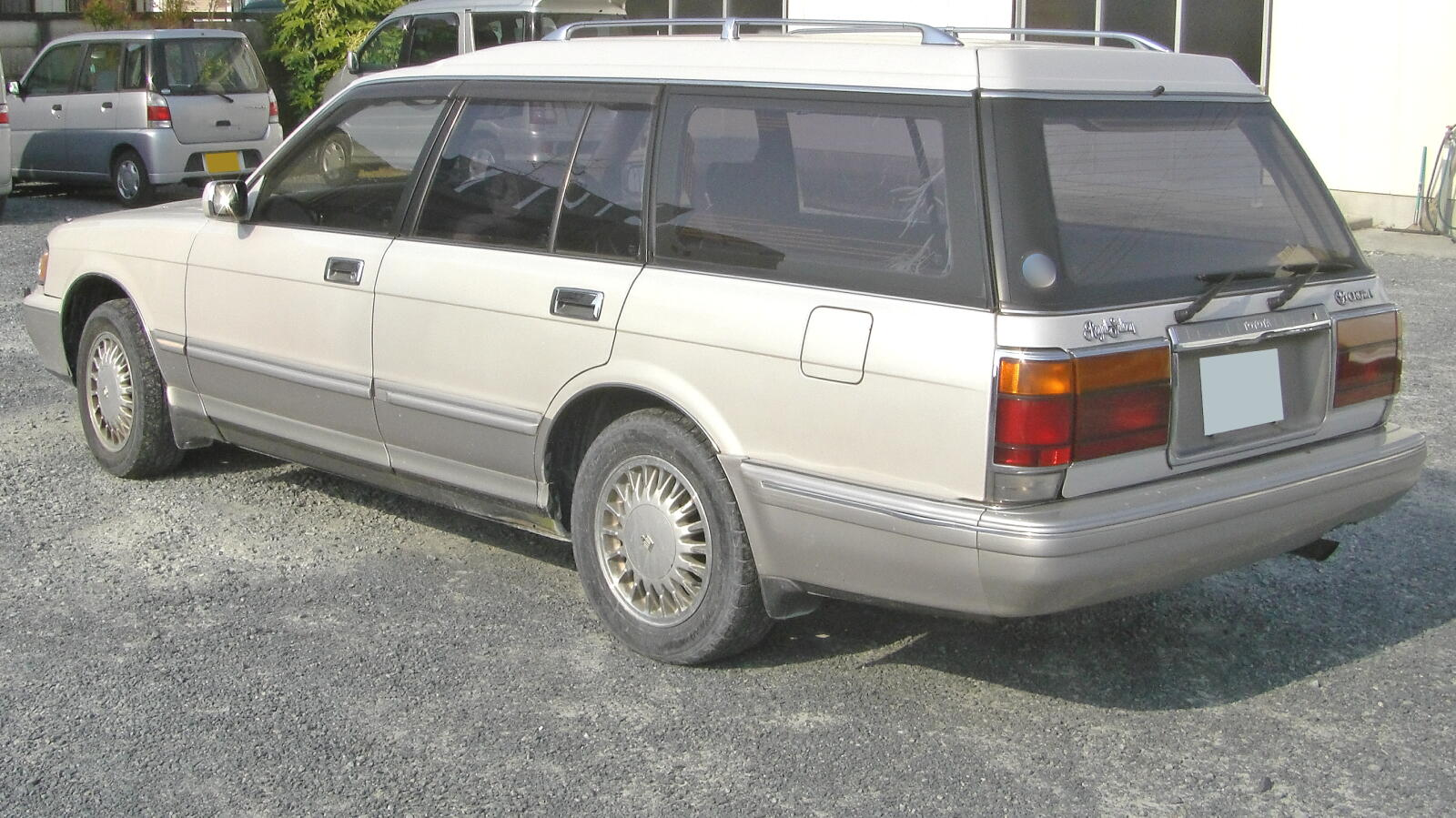
Toyota Crown Royal Saloon wagon (Japan)

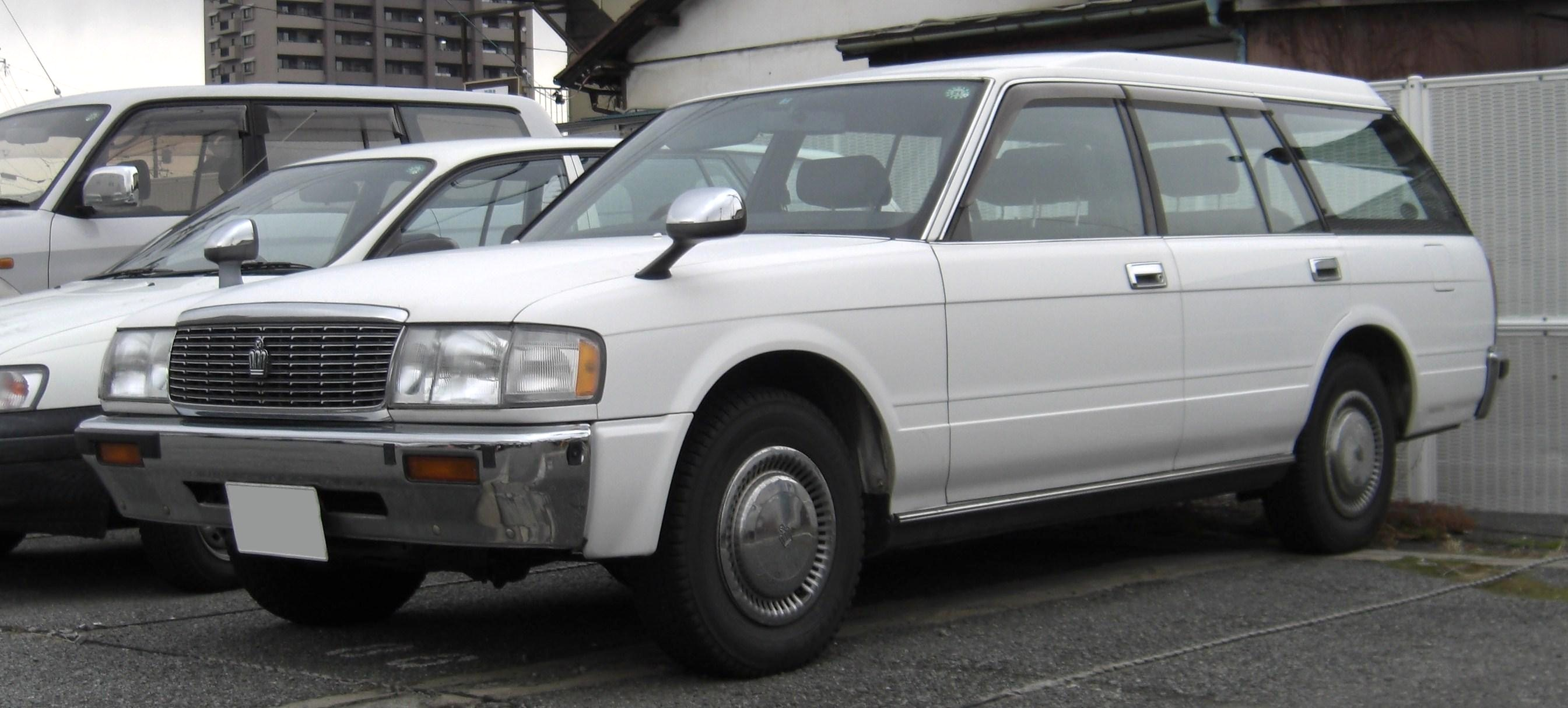
Toyota Crown Van Super Deluxe (Japan)

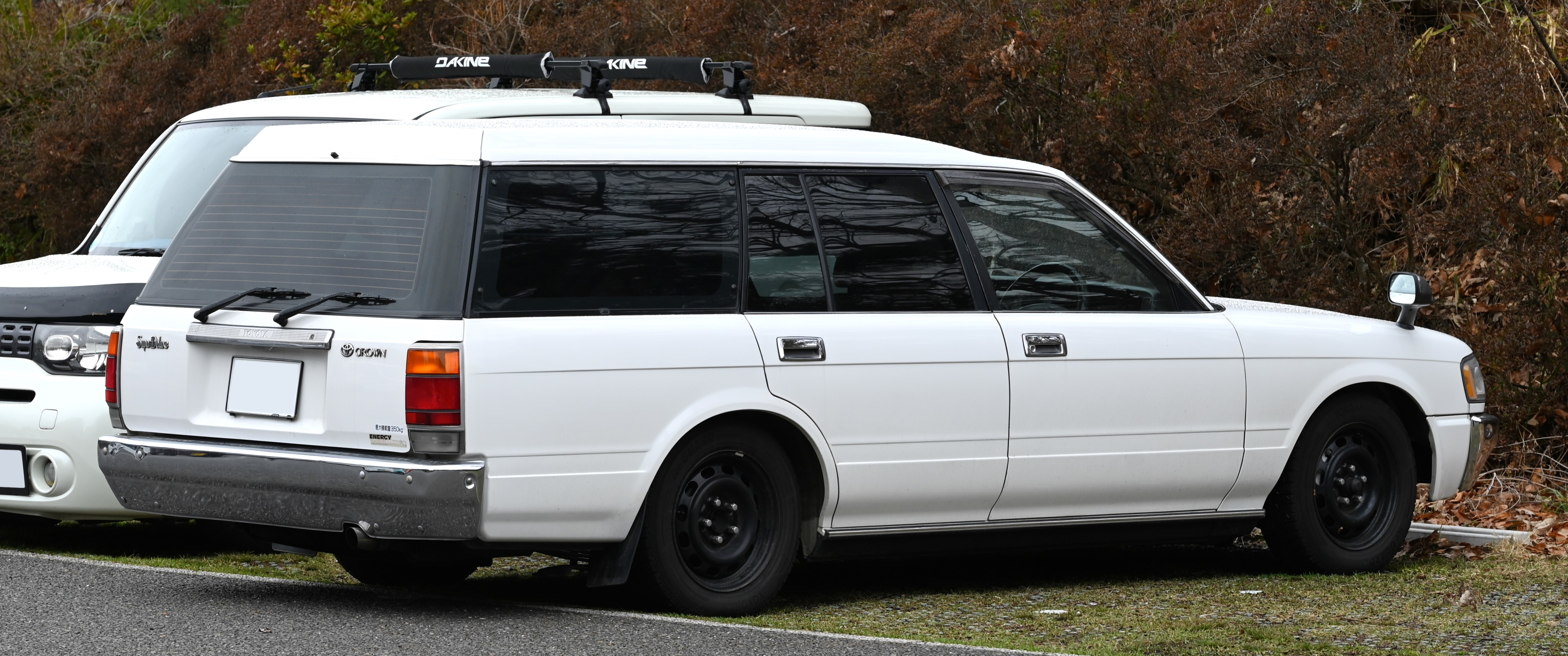
Toyota Crown Van Super Deluxe (Japan)

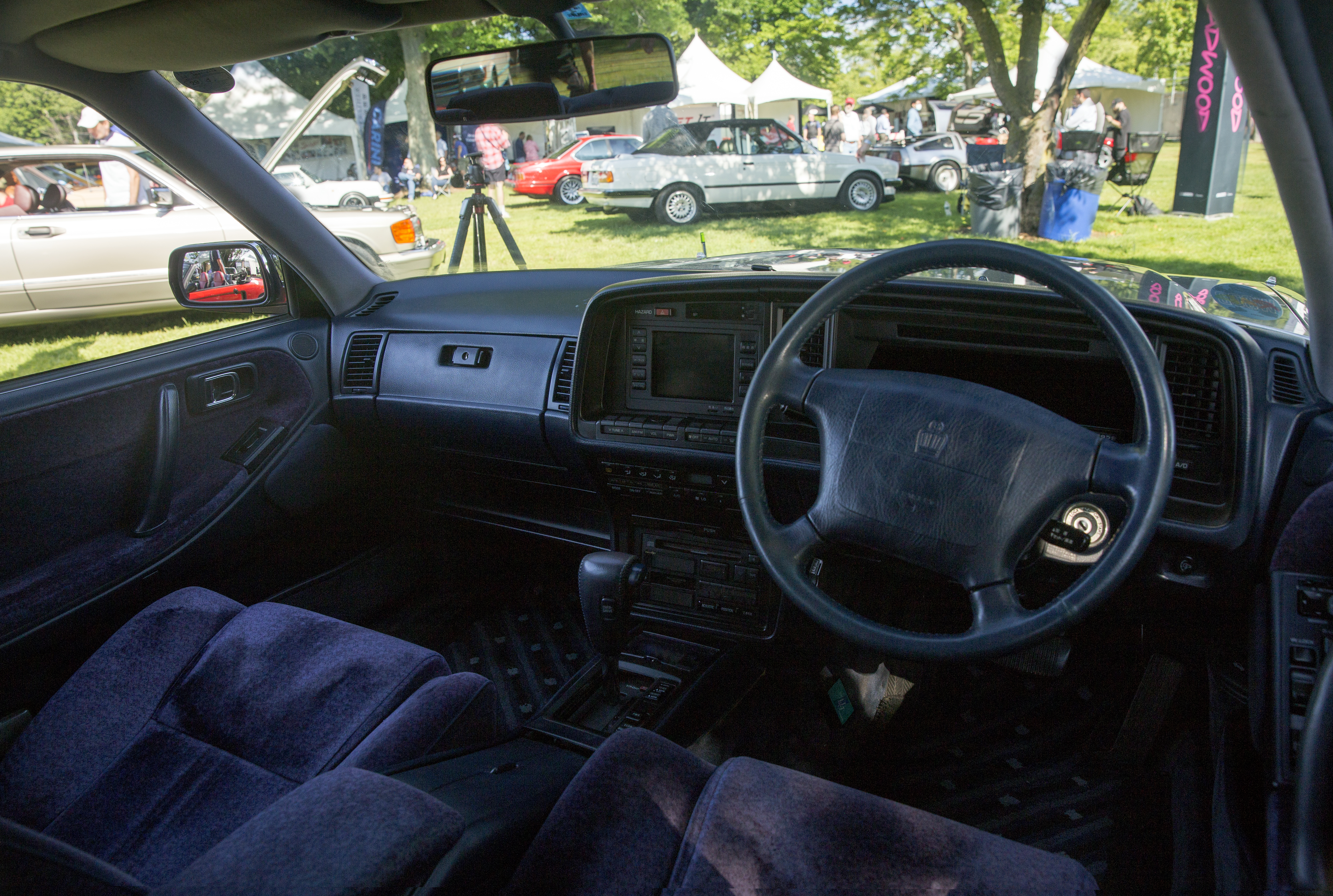
1991 interior (Royal Saloon)

=== Indonesian assembly (1989–2000) ===
This generation marked the return of the Crown to Indonesia in 1989, where it had not been sold regularly since 1984 when it was replaced by GX71 Cressida. This car was assembled locally by Toyota Astra Motor. It was originally sold with the two-liter 1G-FE inline-six engine (GS131). Two trim levels were available, 2.0i Super Saloon with 5-speed manual transmission and 2.0i Royal Saloon with 4-speed automatic transmission. It received major facelift in 1992 and continued to be built after 1995 when the sedan was replaced in Japan. Also in 1995, The 2.0 was replaced with a 2JZ-GE 3-liter engine. Unique for Indonesia, the Crown 3.0 Super Saloon trim was combined with a 5-speed manual transmission, while the more expensive 3.0 Royal Saloon was available with a 4-speed automatic transmission. The production of S130 Crown in Indonesia was stopped in 2000.

=== Saibeijian Crown ===
While the S130 Crown was officially sold by Toyota in China, there was also a rebadged S130 Crown sold as Saibeijian Crown by Datong Saibeijian Auto Works at the same time. This brand also rebadged numerous cars such as Toyota Previa, Honda Accord, Nissan Sunny and Honda Odyssey.

In the early 1980s, the number of imported cars in China increased dramatically, despite the high import tax. China's consumer spending was getting out of control and created a severe trade deficit. Customs duties on imported goods were raised in March 1985 and a new "regulatory tax" was added a few months later. By the fall of 1985, a two-year moratorium on nearly all vehicle imports was imposed. While limiting imports, China also tried to increase local production by boosting the various existing joint-venture passenger car production agreements, as well as adding new ones. But the unclear definition of "car production in China" at that time, inspired the local entrepreneurs to use this loophole.

These rebadged cars were actually fully imported cars from Japan and then were shipped to Hong Kong but without tires, mirrors, and door handles to be classified as "car parts", thus avoiding 60-80% import tax. The remaining parts were also shipped from Japan to Hong Kong and was assembled as a full car at Guangdong. But to be able to sell these cars, this Guangdong-based company need a government approved local automobile brand. The company then made a business deal with Shanxi-based small bus manufacturer, Datong Saibeijian Auto Works, to use their licensed brand for selling these cars and one of them was the Saibeijian Crown.

This was barely concealed smuggling. This made both the real joint ventures that invested so much money and the Chinese government that lost their income from the import tax unhappy. This led to the government arresting more than 200 government, customs, and law enforcement officials in the southern Guangdong area around Zhanjiang on September 8, 1998. This affair was known as the "9898 smuggling case", the largest mainland smuggling racket of the last 50 years. The state's lost revenue was estimated around ¥30 billion from the illegal import of thousands of tonnes of crude oil, steel, cars, and other manufactured goods.

== Ninth generation (S140; 1991) ==
Ninth generation
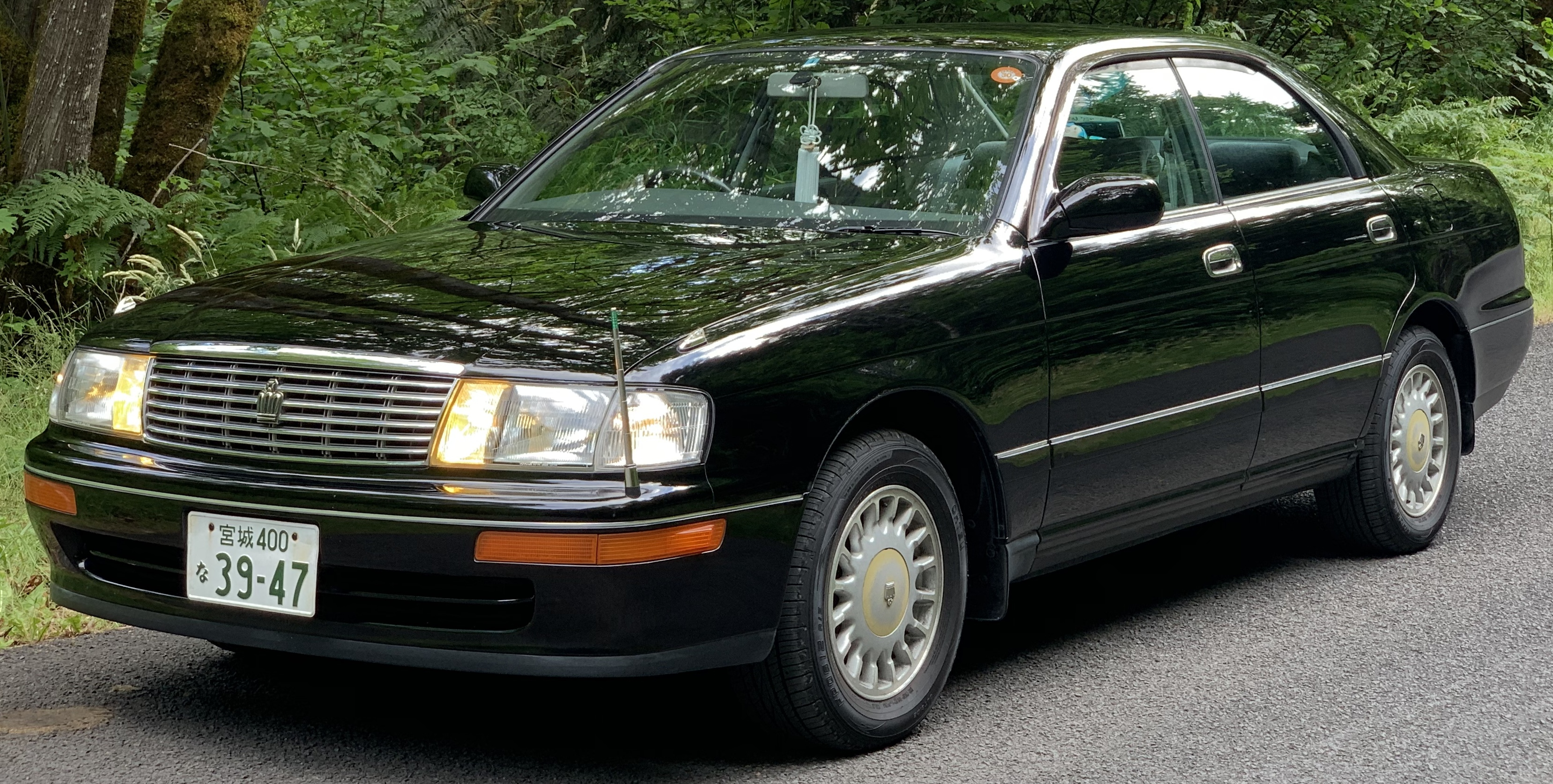
- 1993 Toyota Crown Royal Touring (JZS141; Japan)

Overview
- Model code: S140
- Production: October 1991–November 1995

Body and chassis
- Body style: 4-door pillared hardtop sedan
- Layout: Front-engine, rear-wheel-drive
- Related: Toyota Crown Majesta (S140); Lexus GS (S140)

Powertrain
- Engine: Gasoline: 2.0 L 1G-FE I6 (GS141); 2.5 L 1JZ-GE I6 (JZS141); 3.0 L 2JZ-GE I6 (JZS143/145); Diesel: 2.4 L 2L-TE/THE I4 diesel (LS141)
- Transmission: 4-speed automatic; 5-speed automatic

Dimensions
- Wheelbase: 2,730 mm (107.5 in)
- Length: 4,800 mm (189.0 in) (Royal Saloon); 4,690 mm (184.6 in)
- Width: 1,750 mm (68.9 in) (Royal Saloon); 1,695 mm (66.7 in)
- Height: 1,440 mm (56.7 in)
- Curb weight: 1,620 kg (3,571 lb)

Launched in 1991, this model of Toyota Crown departed from the traditional styling of previous models, and introduced the new Royal Touring trim level. The new hardtop model carried the S140 chassis designation, while the refreshed Crown sedan and wagon still kept the S130 chassis from the previous generation Crown. Unlike its predecessors, this model was produced exclusively in right-hand drive and consequently was not exported to markets with right-hand traffic. Engine options used in the hardtop model were the 2JZ-GE 3000cc DOHC, 1JZ-GE 2500cc DOHC, and the 2L-THE diesel 2400cc SOHC engine. The 1G-FE 2000cc DOHC engine was carried over from the eighth generation for use in the sedan and wagon models. Transmission options were an optional five speed transmission dubbed "5ECT-i" used with the 2JZ-GE, a four speed "ECT-i" transmission used with the 2JZ-GE, and a four speed "ECT" transmission for the 1JZ-GE, 2L-THE, and 1G-FE equipped vehicles.

For the ninth-generation Crown, the Super Edition trim level was removed, and the Super Saloon trim became the entry-level trim. A new trim level was introduced, called Royal Touring, meant to be a mid-tier model with the option of both the 2JZ-GE and 1JZ-GE. The trim levels for the S140 hardtop are Super Select, Super Saloon Extra, Royal Touring, Royal Saloon, and Royal Saloon G. The Royal Saloon G trim kept all of the luxurious options of the previous generation including a fully digital gauge cluster, GPS navigation, and more safety equipment than other trim levels. As with the previous generation, the air suspension-equipped Royal Saloon G has a different model code (JZS145 versus JZS143 for the coil sprung model).

Styling was largely changed from the S130 generation. The design had shifted to a more curved front and rear end, and removed the Crown badges from the C-pillars which had been on previous models. A brand new taillight design was introduced, which was a curved, wrap-around design. The front end styling was influenced from the UCF10 Toyota Celsior which was released two years prior to the S140 Crown hardtop. Because of the new rear-end styling moving away from the traditional separate, squared taillights, the design was negatively received. This caused sales and popularity to be much lower than its rivals, the Nissan Cedric and Gloria, as well as the previous generation Crown.

In January 1993, a special-edition model was released, called the Prestige Saloon series for the Royal Saloon G and the Royal Saloon trims, and the Owners Prestige series for the Royal Touring trim. This special model included new chrome door handles and an all-chrome grille.

Later in 1993, a facelift model was released. The rear design went back to that of the S130 type Crown which was more favorably received. Other changes included restoring the Crown emblems to the C-pillars, a further revised front grille, front bumper, and rear bumper. This newly revised Crown was well received over the previous styling, and was able to win back some sales for the ninth-generation Crown.

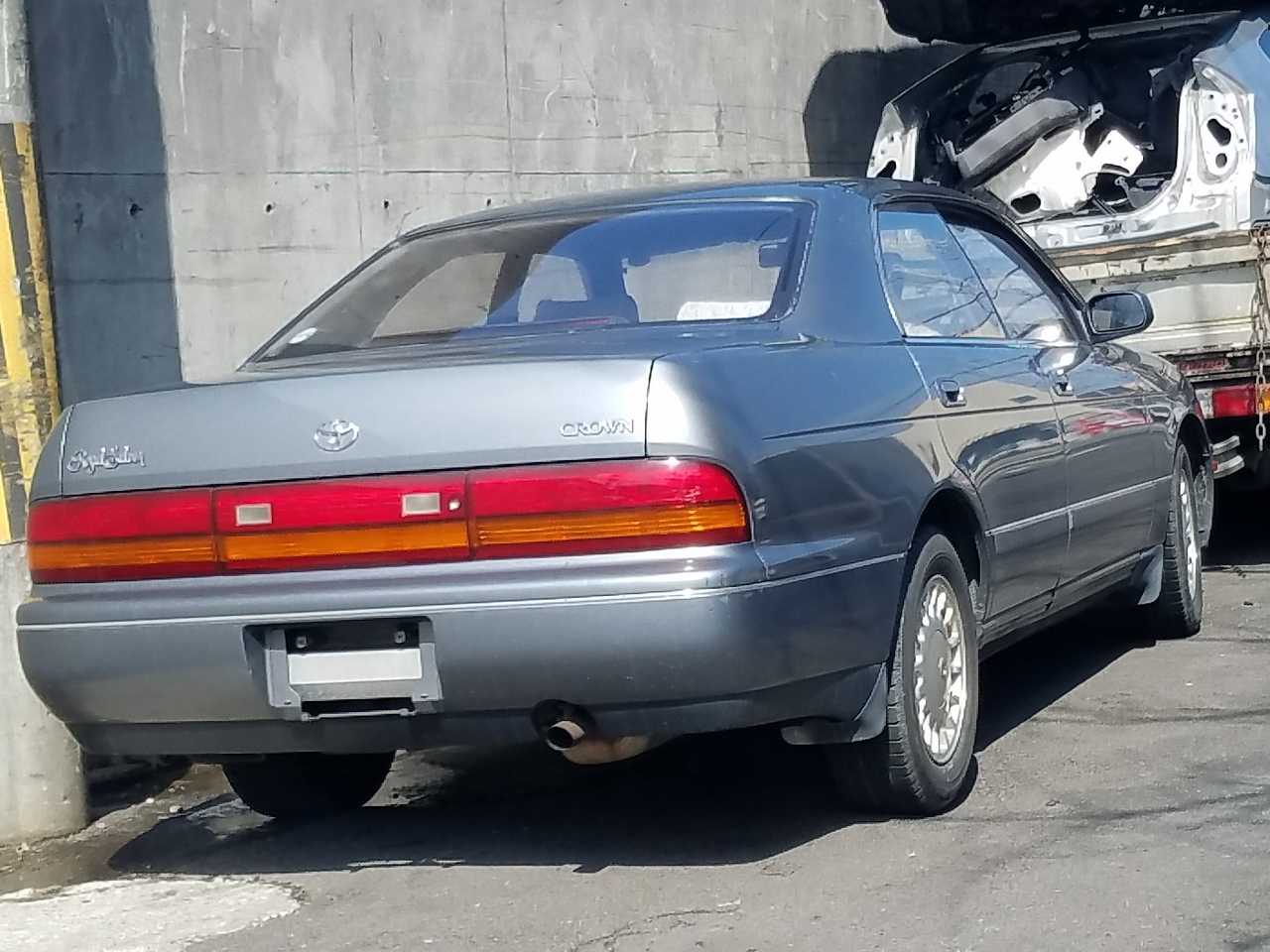
Pre-facelift Crown Royal Saloon Hardtop (Japan)

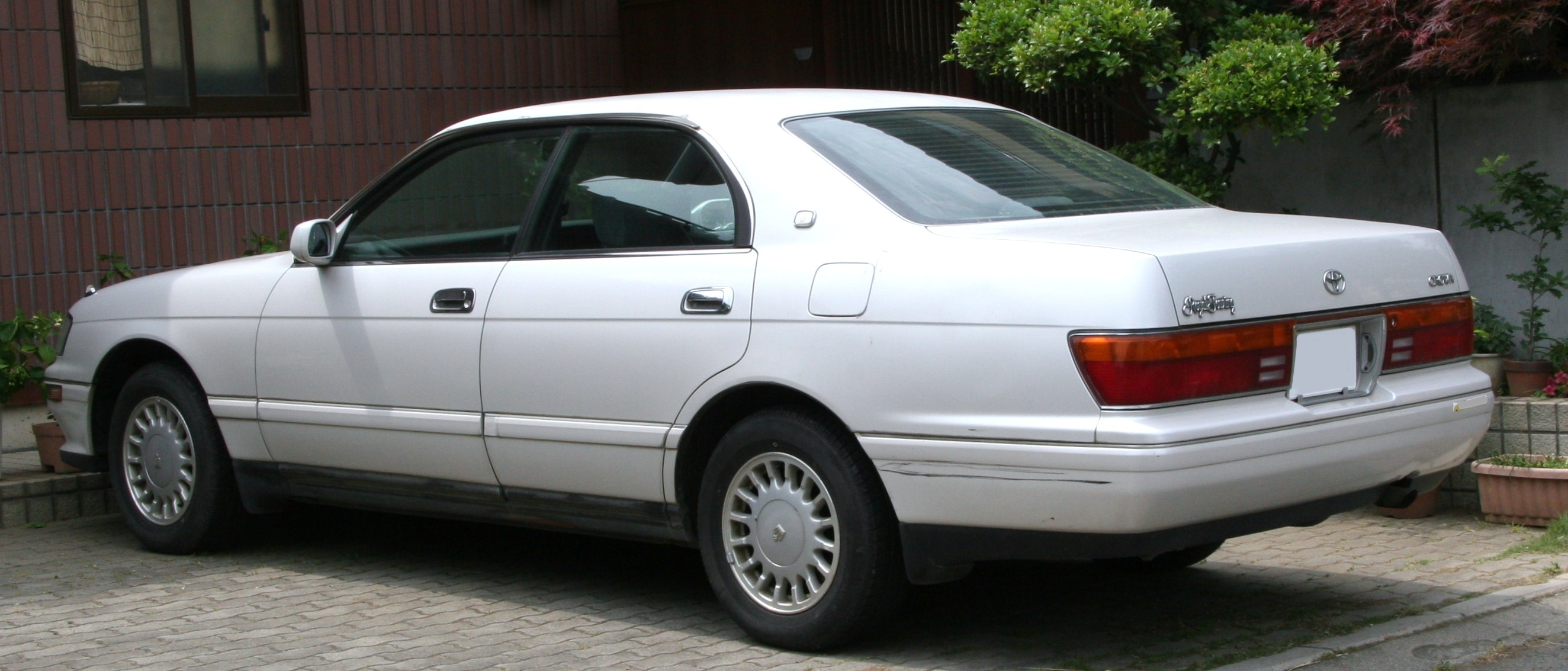
Facelift Crown Royal Saloon Hardtop (Japan)

== Tenth generation (S150; 1995) ==
Tenth generation
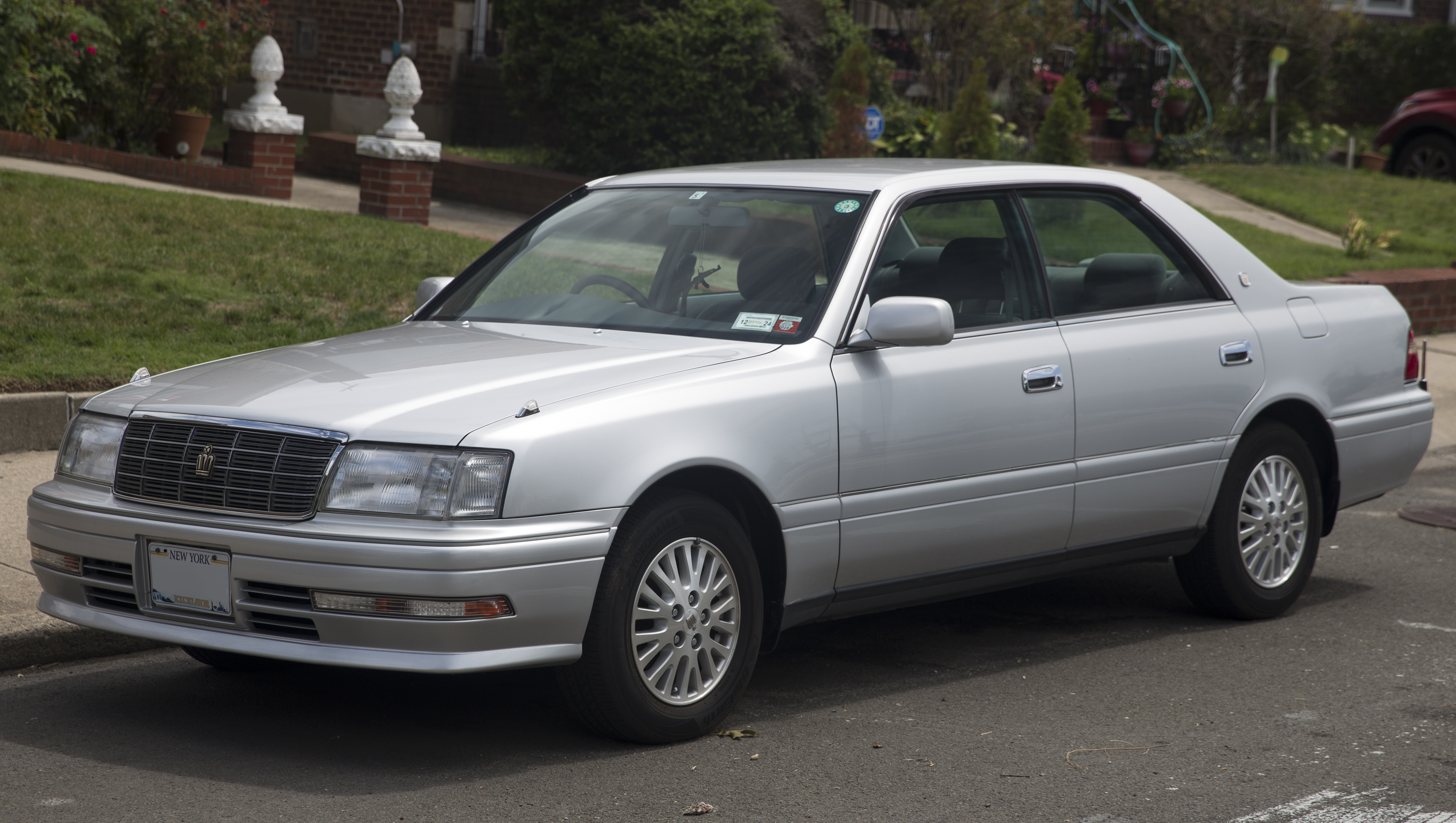
- Pre-facelift Toyota Crown Hardtop 2.5 Royal Saloon (JZS151, Japan)

Overview
- Model code: S150
- Production: 1995–1999 (Hardtop); 1995–2001 (Sedan)
- Assembly: Japan: Toyota, Aichi (Motomachi plant)

Body and chassis
- Body style: 4-door sedan; 4-door pillared hardtop sedan
- Layout: Front-engine, rear-wheel-drive; Front-engine, four-wheel-drive
- Related: Toyota Crown Majesta (S150); Lexus GS (S160)

Powertrain
- Engine: 2.0 L 1G-FE I6; 2.0 L 1G-GPE LPG I6; 2.5 L 1JZ-GE I6; 3.0 L 2JZ-GE I6; 2.4 L 2L-TE diesel I4
- Transmission: 4-speed automatic; 5-speed manual; 5-speed automatic

Dimensions
- Wheelbase: 2,780 mm (109.4 in)
- Length: 4,820 mm (189.8 in); 4,690 mm (184.6 in) (2.0 L)
- Width: 1,760 mm (69.3 in); 1,695 mm (66.7 in) (2.0 L)
- Height: 1,425 mm (56.1 in)

The 150-series Crown, launched in 1995, had boxier styling than the previous generation and was built as a sedan and hardtop (frameless door window) only. This was the first Crown to not be built using body-on-frame construction, adopting the unibody construction introduced with the 140-series Majesta. The wagon retained the old S130 chassis until 1999.

The hardtop was offered in Royal Extra, Royal Saloon, Royal Saloon G, and sporty Royal Touring trim levels, while sedans were offered in Super Deluxe, Super Saloon, Super Saloon Extra and Royal Saloon trims.

Gasoline engines were offered solely as inline 6-cylinder units with 2.0, 2.5, or 3.0-liter displacements, while an LPG version of the 2.0 L engine was offered, as was a 2.4 L 4-cylinder turbodiesel. As with previous generations, all vehicles with the 2.0 L engine were offered in a slightly shorter and narrower vehicle so as to be in compliance with Japanese government dimension regulations. All-wheel drive was offered for the Royal Extra and Royal Saloon. The S150 Crown would be the last generation to be offered with a manual transmission.

In 1996, it won the Automotive Researchers' and Journalists' Conference Car of the Year award in Japan which it shared with the Crown Majesta.

Unlike most preceding generations, the S150 Crown was not exported in great numbers. It was mainly sent to China, Hong Kong, the Middle East, and Southeast Asian markets like the Philippines, Singapore and Vietnam, with limited exports to some Caribbean and Latin American countries. These Crowns, with sedan rather than hardtop bodywork, were fitted either with the 2.0-liter 1G-FE or the 3-liter 2JZ-GE unit depending on market conditions.

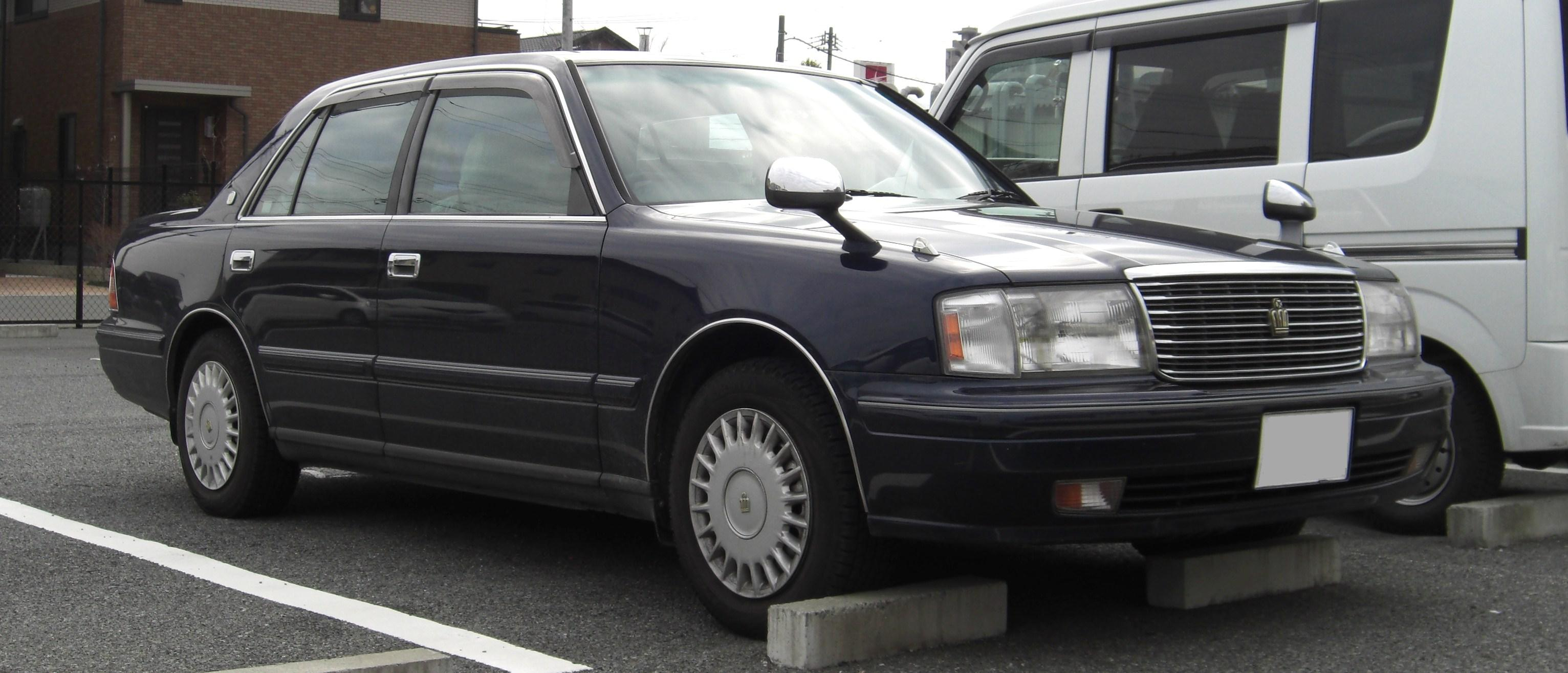
Crown Sedan Super Saloon (Japan)

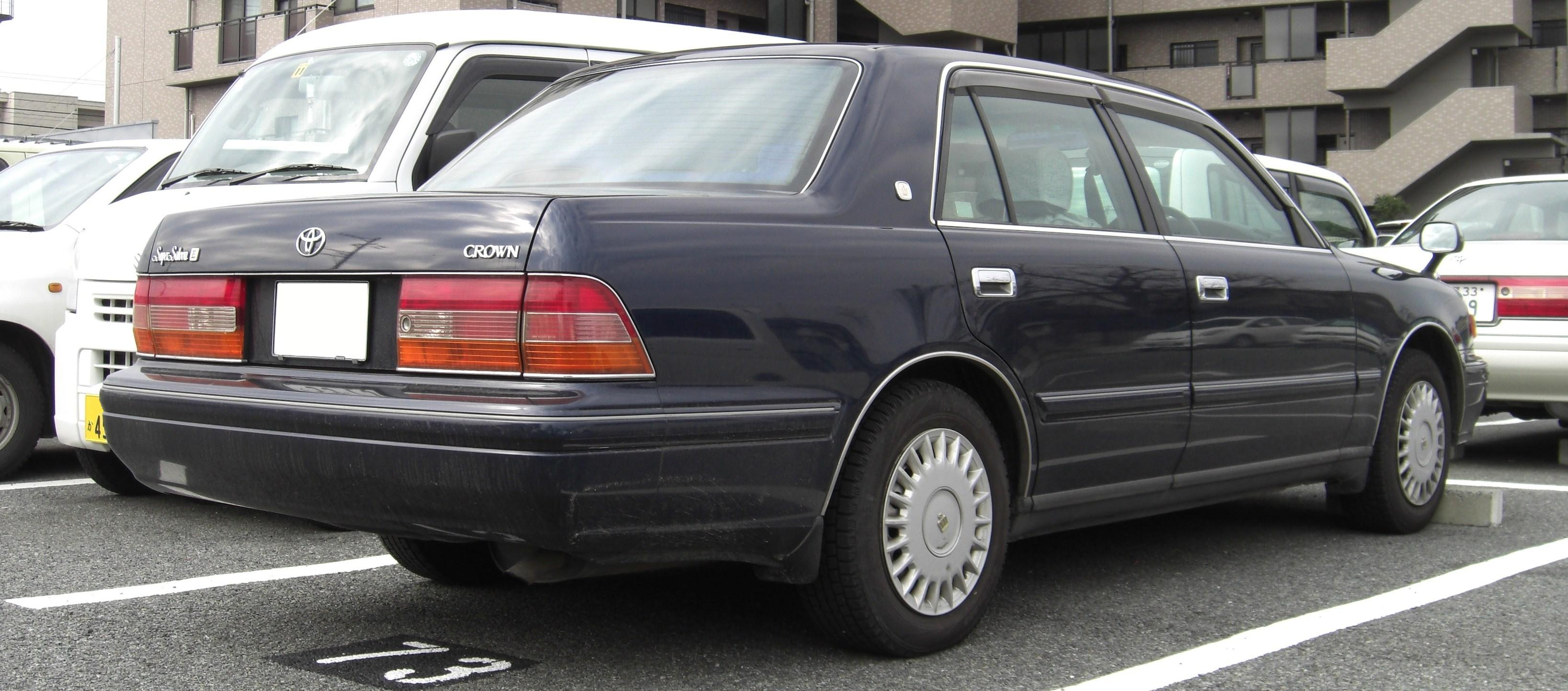
Crown Sedan Super Saloon (Japan)

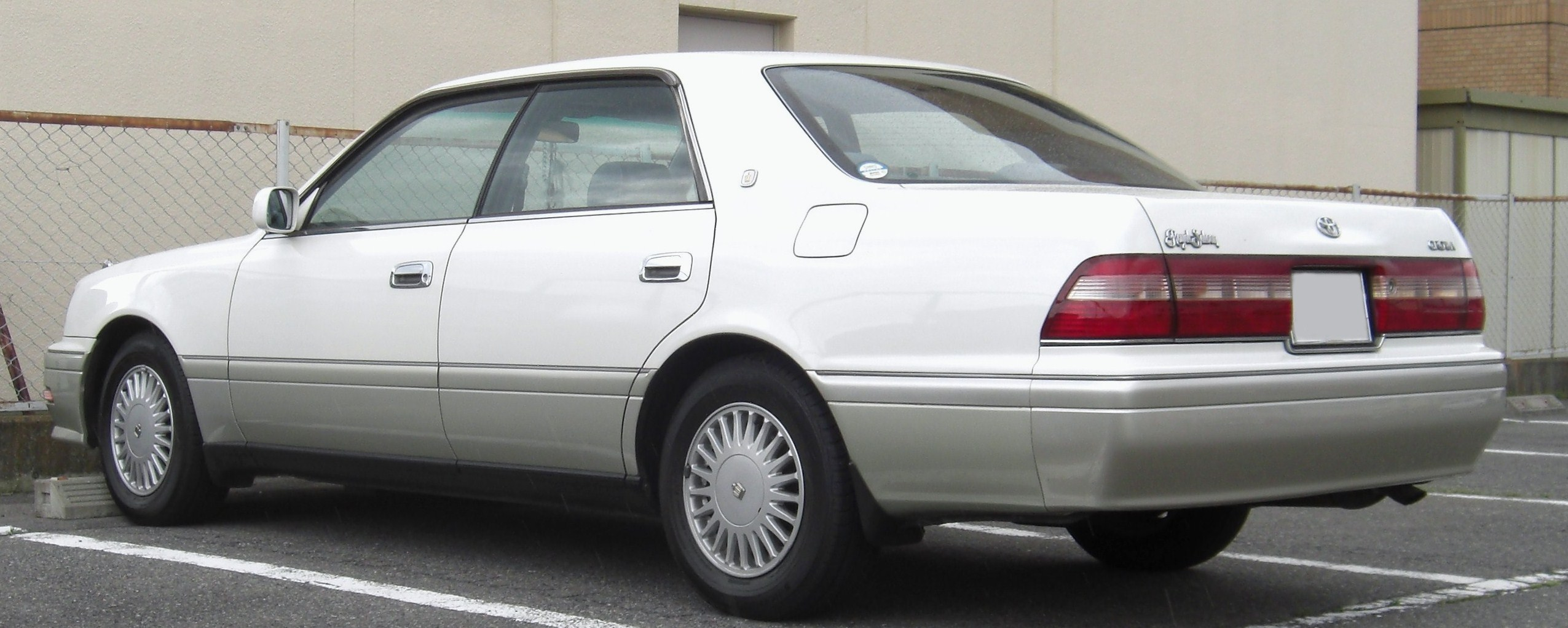
Pre-facelift Crown Royal Saloon Hardtop (JZS151)

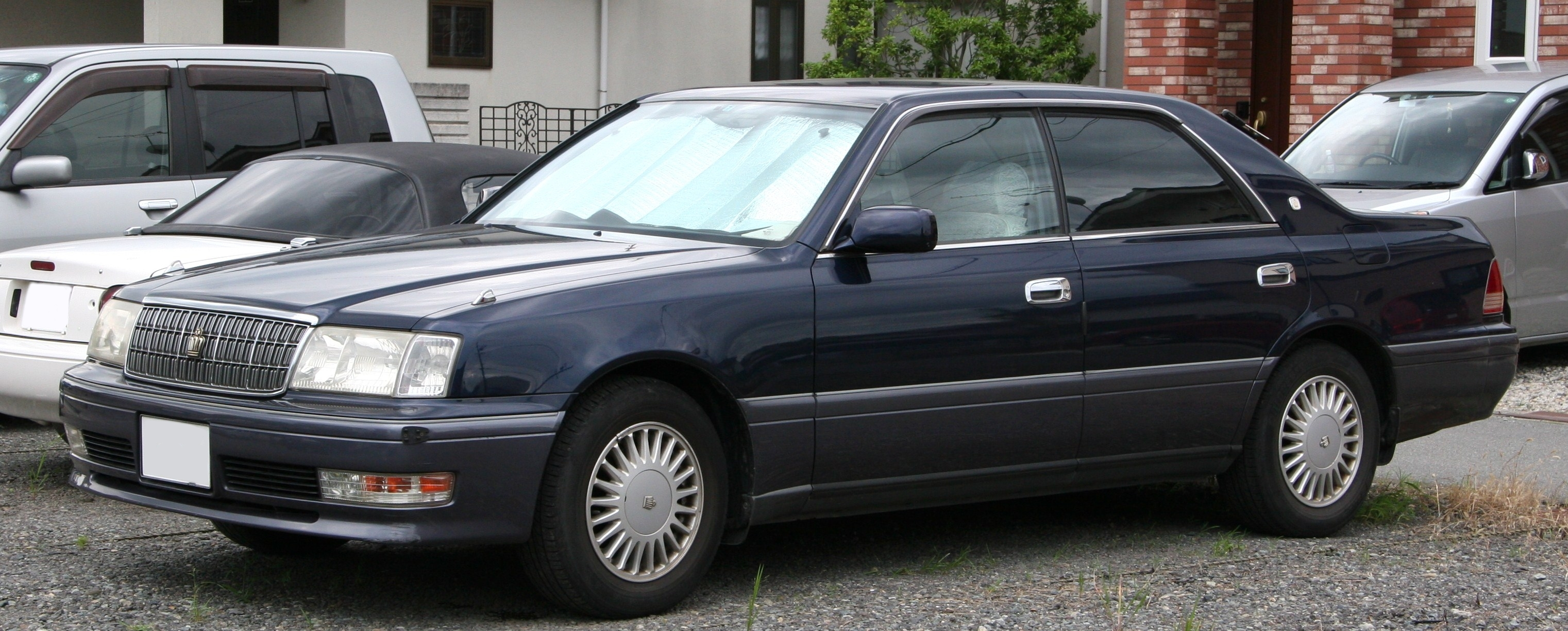
Facelift Crown Royal Saloon Hardtop (JZS151)

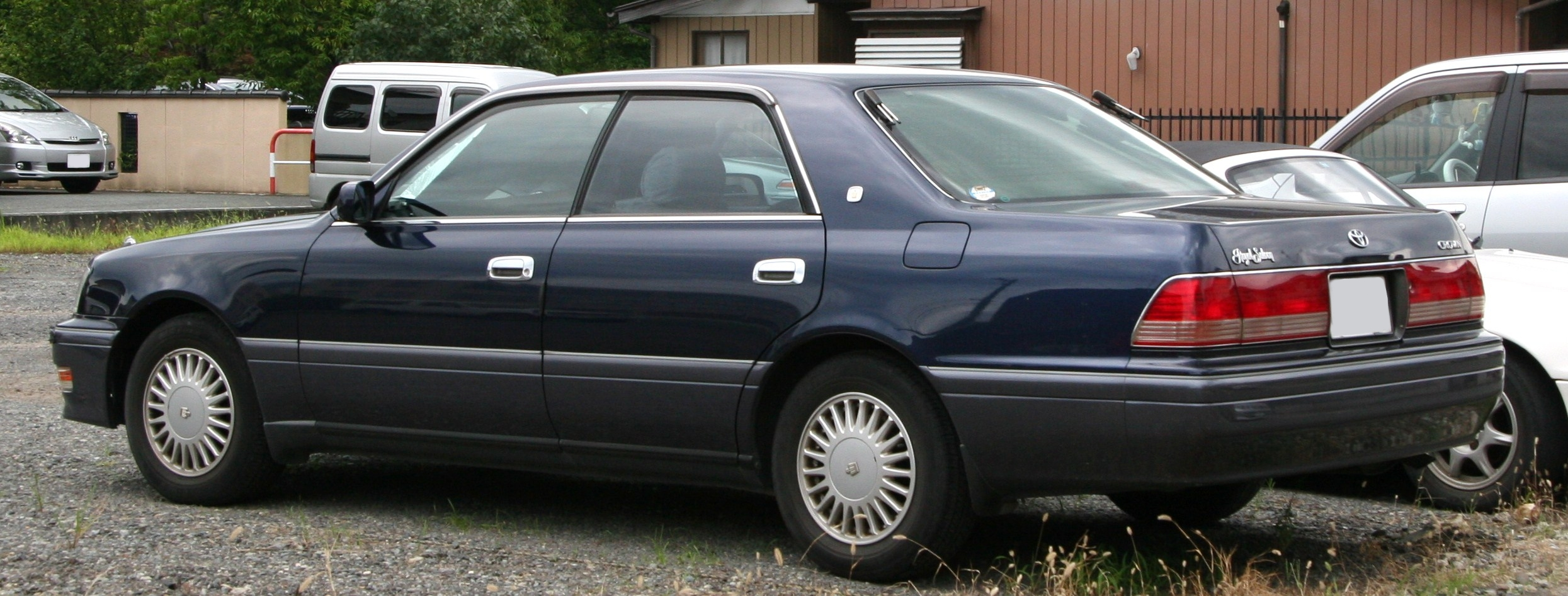
Facelift Crown Royal Saloon Hardtop (JZS151)

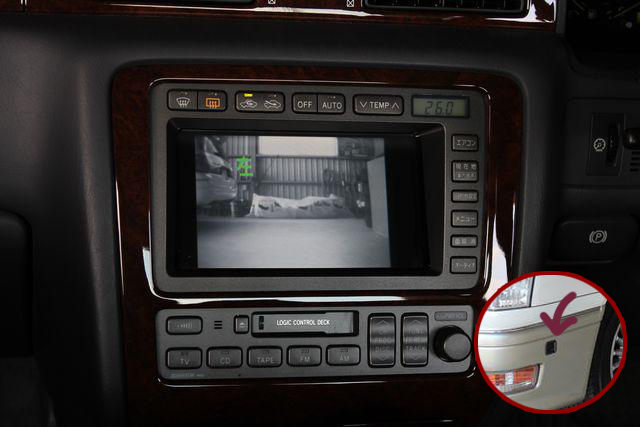
Dashboard with display for navigation and blind spot monitor camera

== Eleventh generation (S170; 1999) ==
Eleventh generation
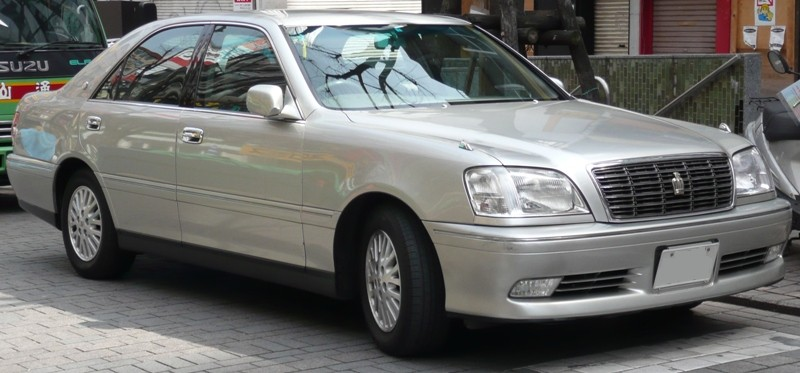
- 1999–2001 Toyota Crown Royal Saloon (JZS175, Japan)

Overview
- Model code: S170
- Production: 1999–2003 (Sedan); 1999–2007 (Wagon)
- Assembly: Japan: Toyota, Aichi (Motomachi plant)

Body and chassis
- Body style: 4-door sedan; 5-door wagon
- Layout: Front-engine, rear-wheel-drive; Front-engine, four-wheel-drive
- Related: Toyota Crown Majesta (S170)

Powertrain
- Engine: 2.0 L 1G-FE I6; 2.5 L 1JZ-FSE I6; 2.5 L 1JZ-GE I6; 2.5 L 1JZ-GTE turbo I6; 3.0 L 2JZ-FSE I6 mild hybrid; 3.0 L 2JZ-GE I6
- Transmission: 4-speed automatic; 5-speed automatic

Dimensions
- Wheelbase: 2,780 mm (109.4 in)
- Length: 4,820 mm (189.8 in); 4,690 mm (184.6 in) (2.0 L)
- Width: 1,765 mm (69.5 in); 1,695 mm (66.7 in) (2.0 L)
- Height: 1,465 mm (57.7 in)

The 170-series, launched in September 1999, features shorter front overhang therefore maximizing interior and trunk space. There are two different 170-series 4-door Saloon; the Royal and Athlete. The Majesta, while sharing the same S170 chassis, is a separate vehicle which is larger and longer than the Crown and has distinctive front and rear styling. The four-door Hardtop was discontinued and no left-hand drive versions were produced, restricting exports to right-hand drive markets like Singapore. The 170-series Estate launched in December 1999 was the first new Crown Wagon after the 130-series and continued in production until June 2007. The engine installed is either the 2.0, 2.5 or 3.0 in-line-six. The Athlete V has 2.5-liter 1JZ-GTE turbo and was offered in both sedan and wagon versions, however the Athlete V wagon was only available until 2003, despite Crown Estate production continuing until 2007. The Royal Saloon was also offered with a 3.0-liter 2JZ-FSE mild hybrid from August 2001 to 2003, using a belted alternator starter system. The direct-injection version of the 2JZ engine was also offered in non-hybrid models.

For the updated Athlete versions starting from August 2001, the tail lights got an updated design and the front grille changed to a mesh design. Furthermore, the grey cloth interior was changed to black cloth, with black leather becoming an available option. Optional 17-inch wheels were also offered starting from 2001. An innovation was the electronically controlled (Toyota Electronic Modulated Suspension) air suspension combining nonlinear H-infinity control of damping force and roll-orientation control.

The 170-series Crown replaced the aging 130-series in the Indonesian market.

A total of 10,545 Athlete V sedans were manufactured, with a further 5,012 Athlete V Estates manufactured.

=== Gallery ===
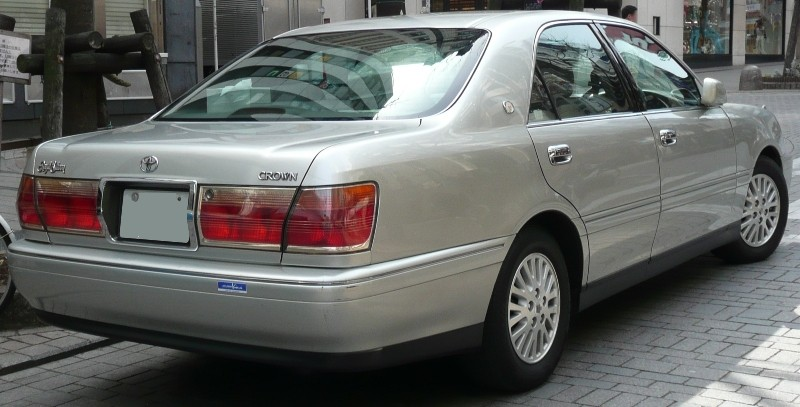
1999–2001 Crown Royal Saloon (JZS175, Japan)

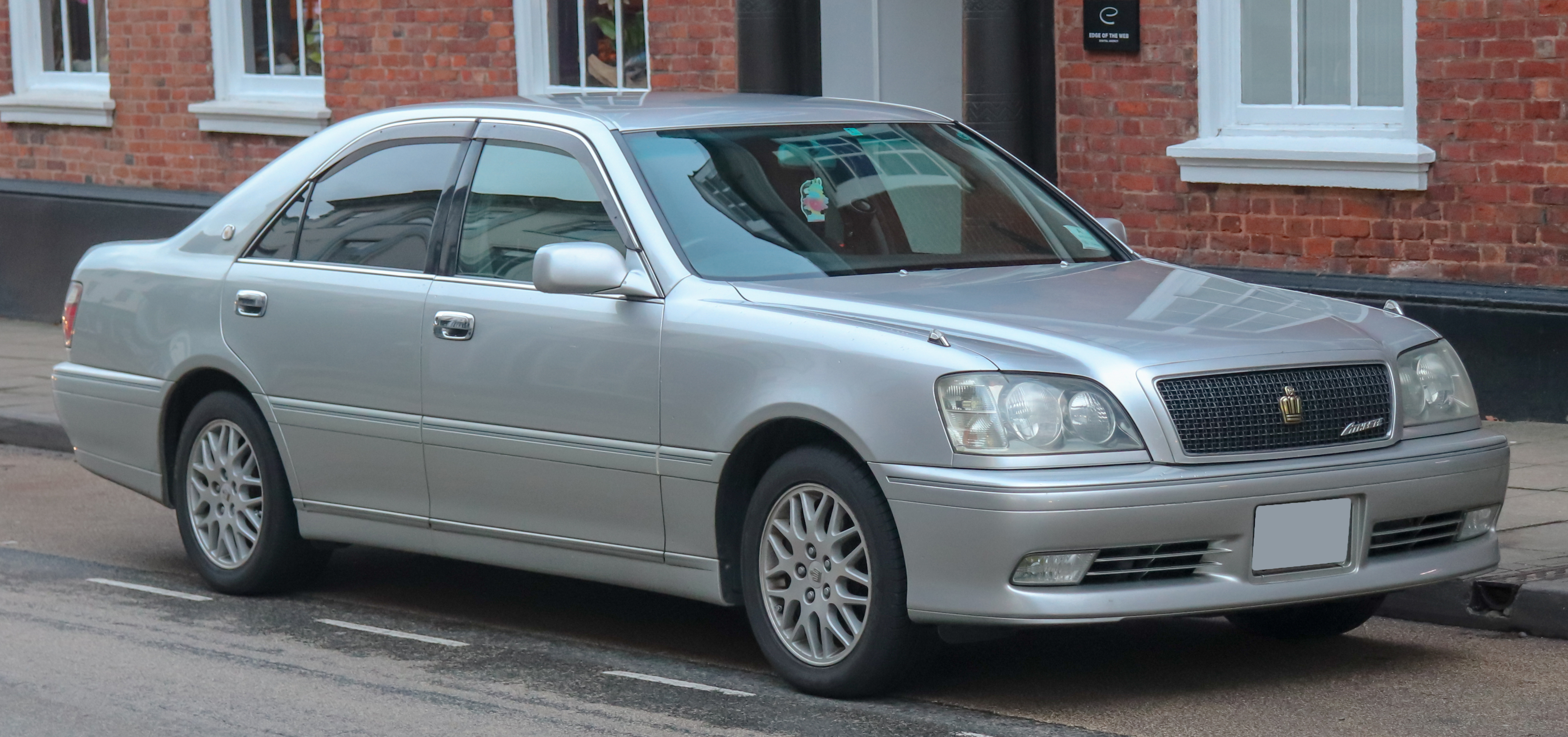
1999–2001 Crown Athlete V (JZS171, Japan)

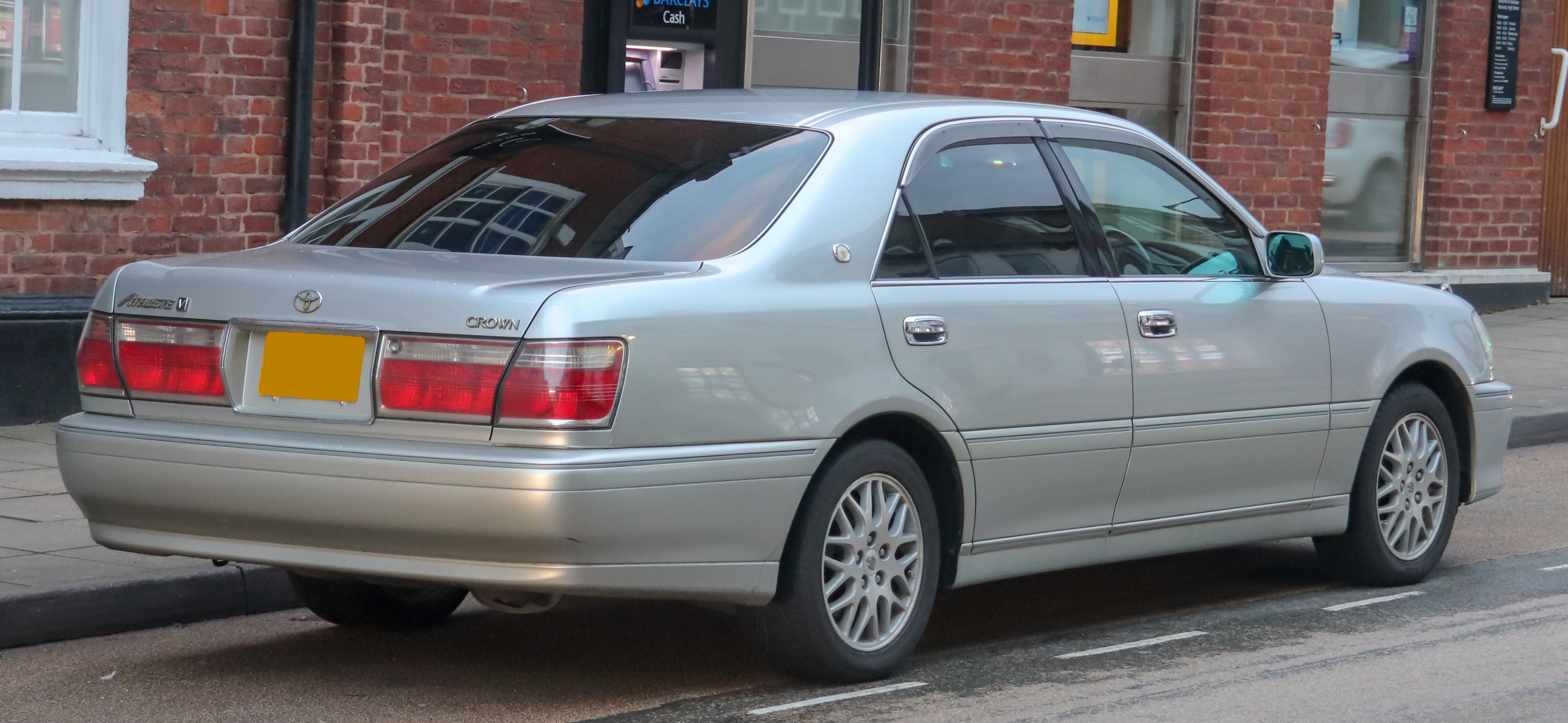
1999–2001 Crown Athlete V (JZS171, Japan)

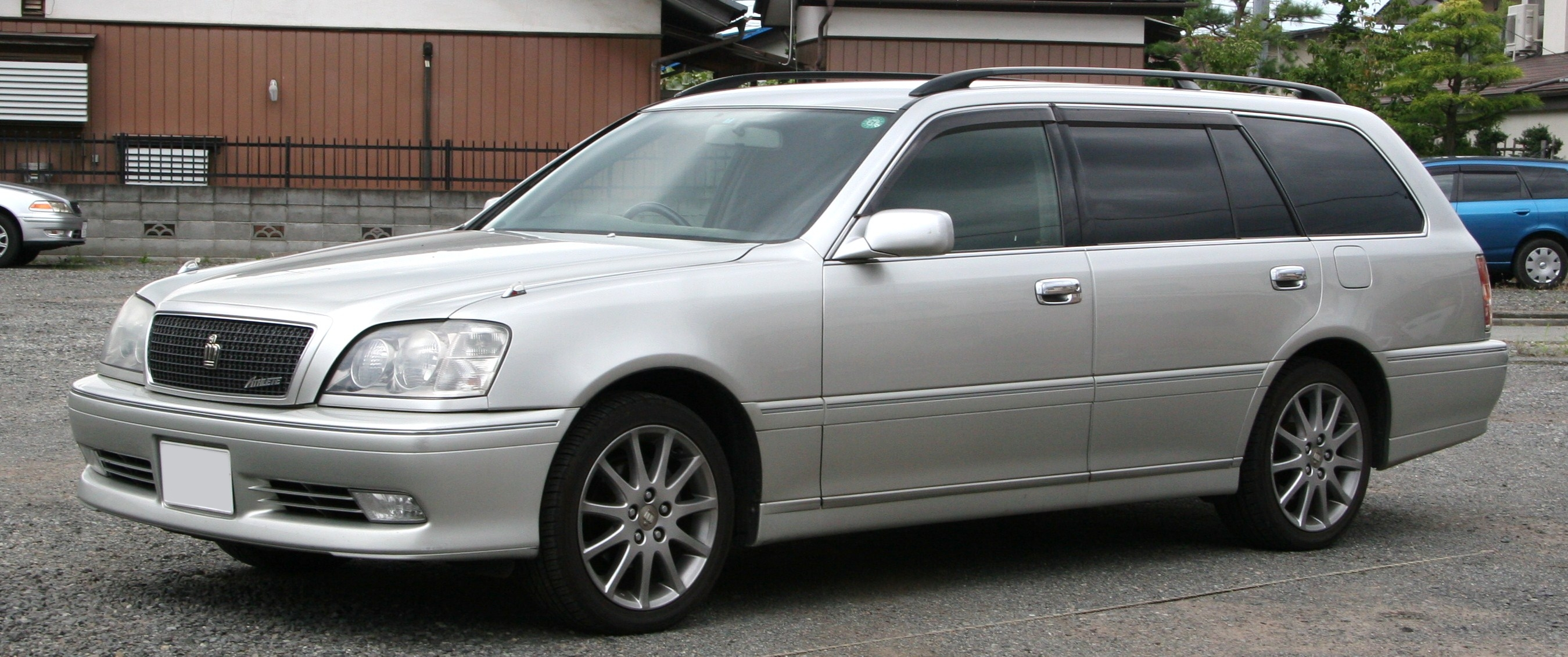
1999–2001 Crown Estate Athlete (JZS171W, Japan)

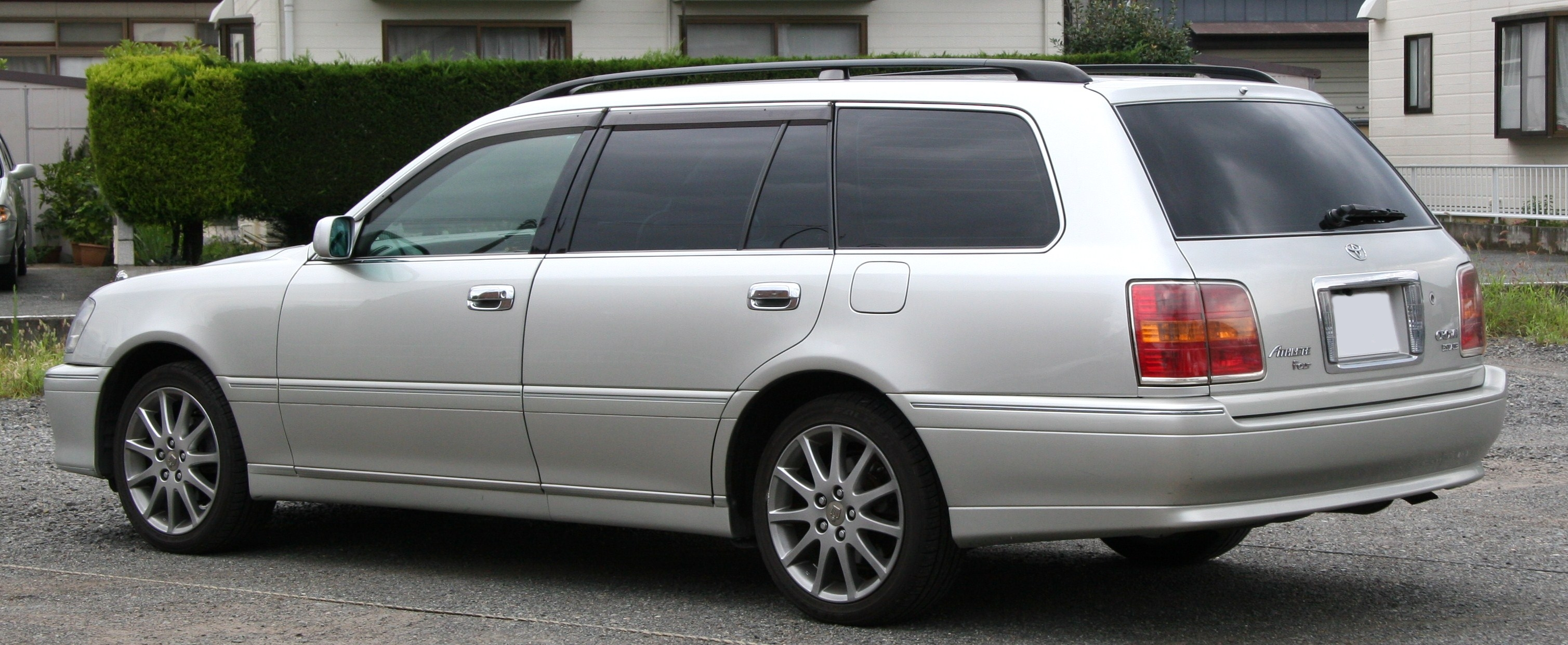
1999–2001 Crown Estate Athlete (JZS171W, Japan)

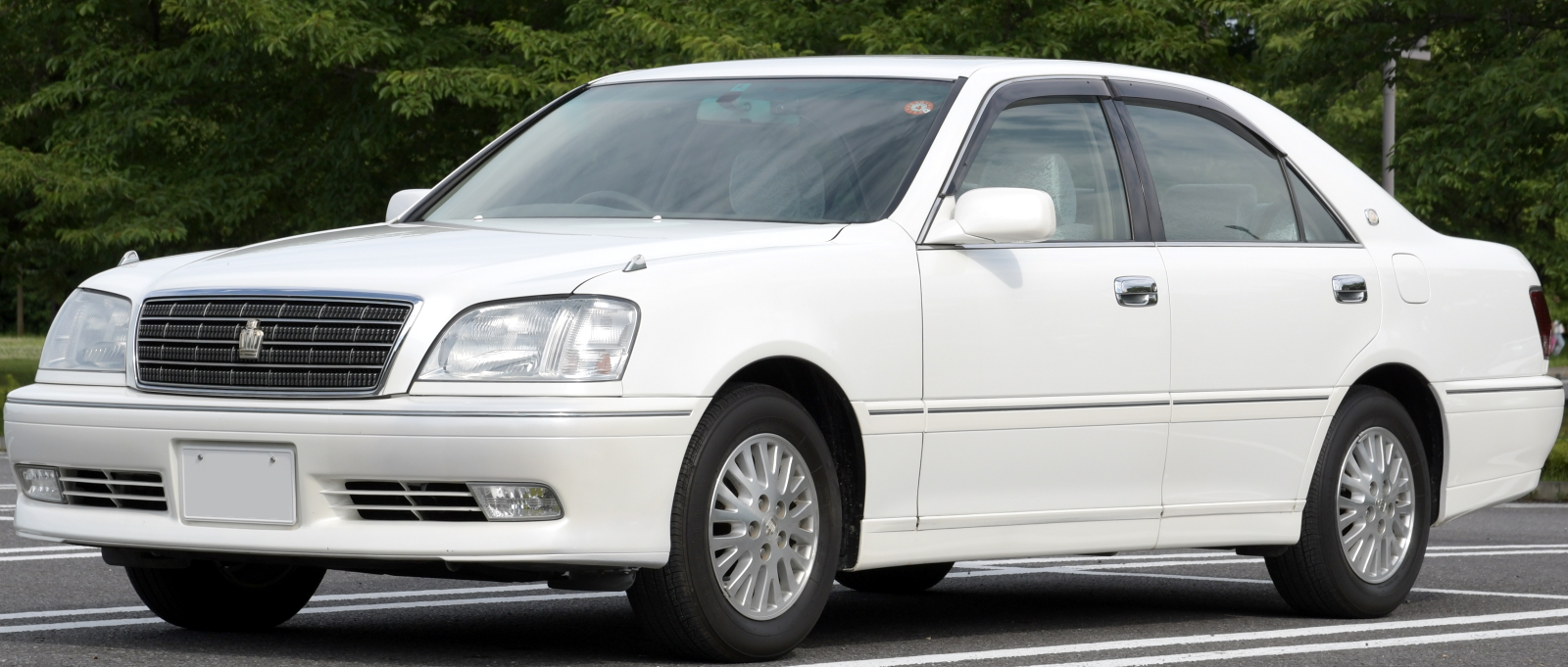
2001–2003 Crown Royal Extra Limited (GS171, Japan)

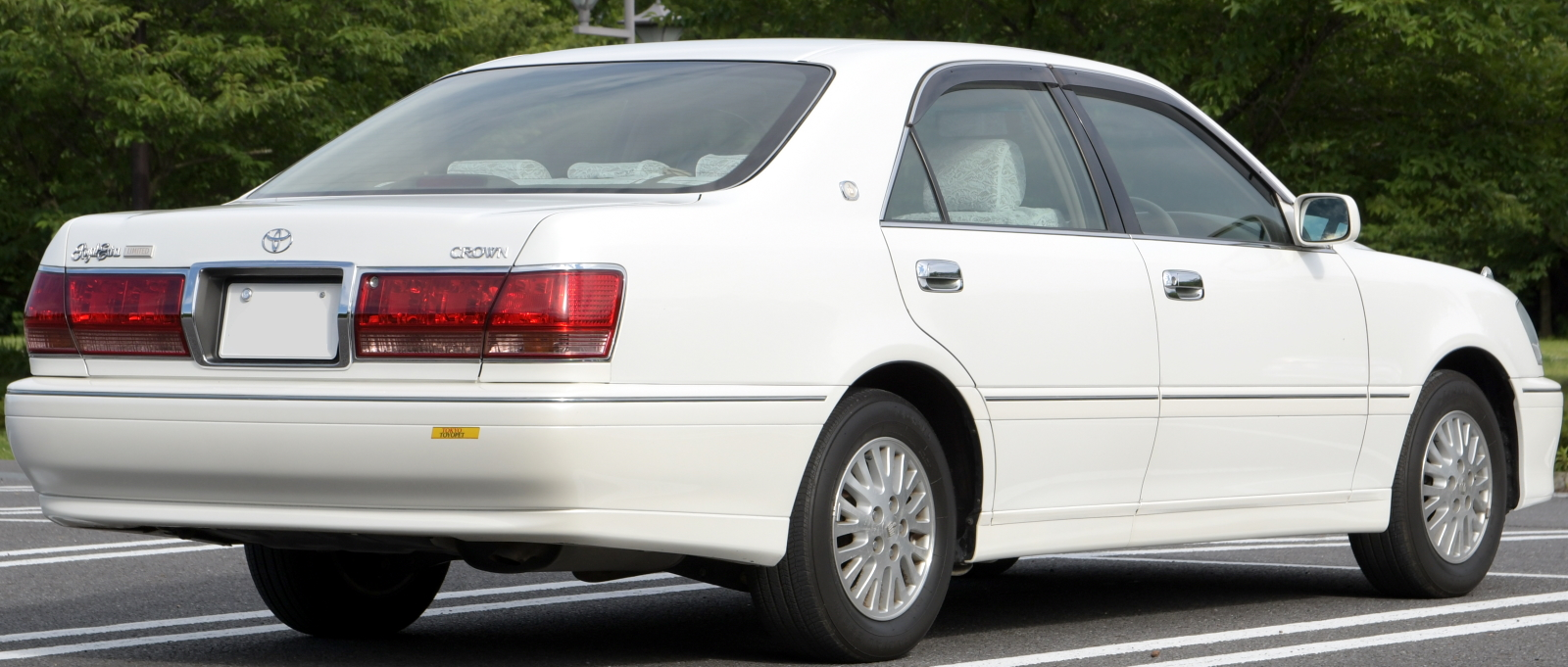
2001–2003 Crown Royal Extra Limited (GS171, Japan)

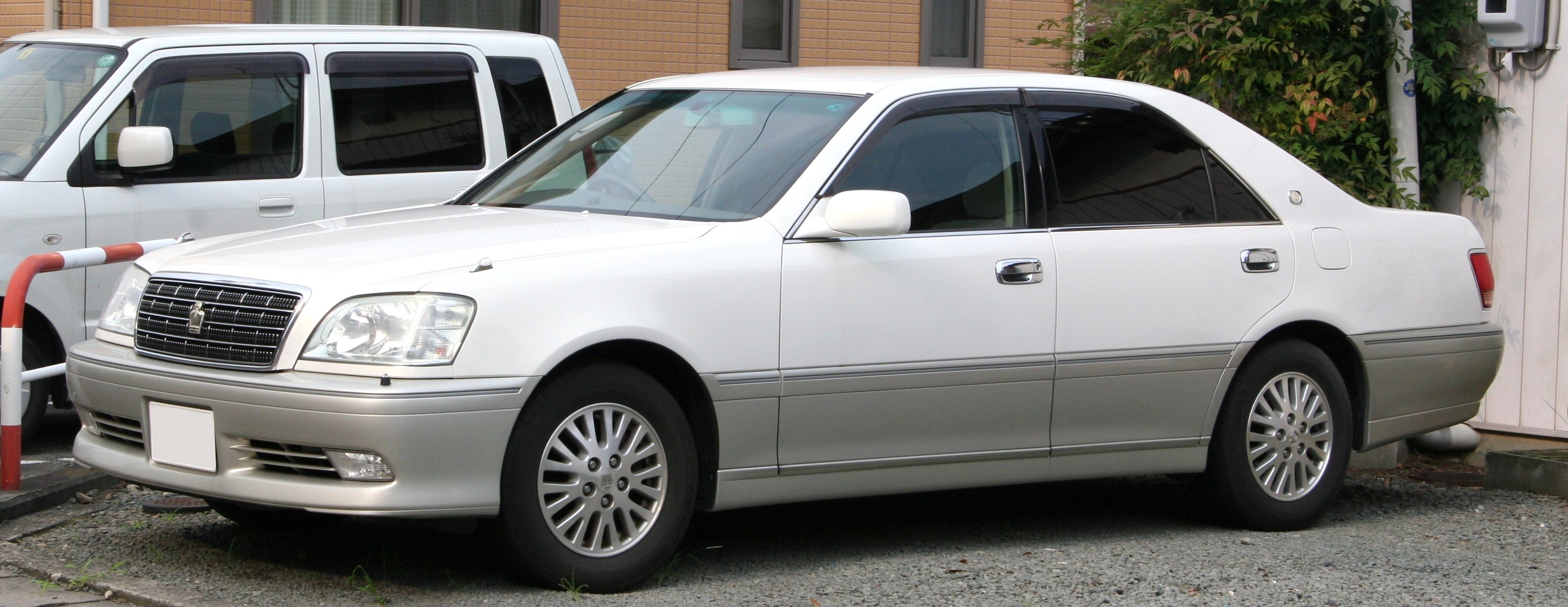
2001–2003 Crown Royal Saloon (JZS175, Japan)

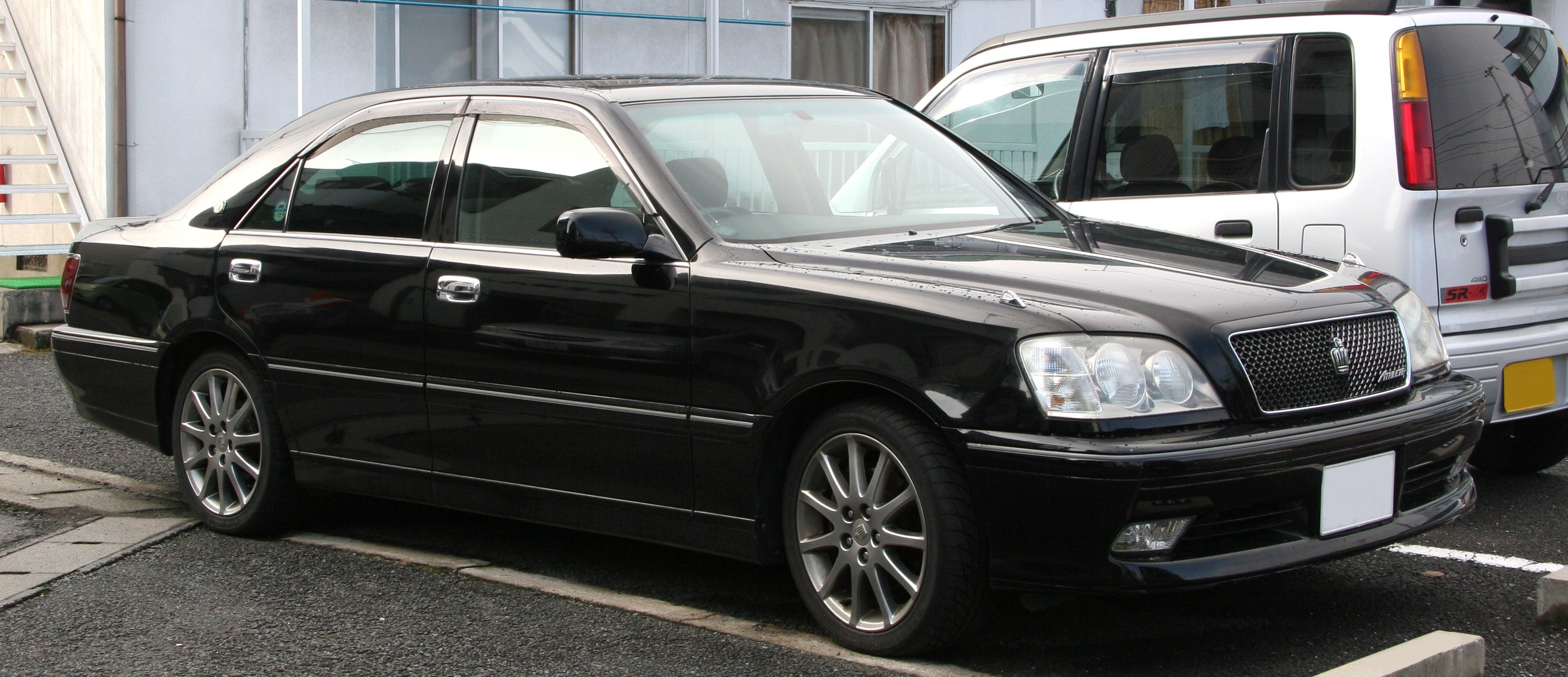
2001–2003 Crown Athlete V (JZS171, Japan)

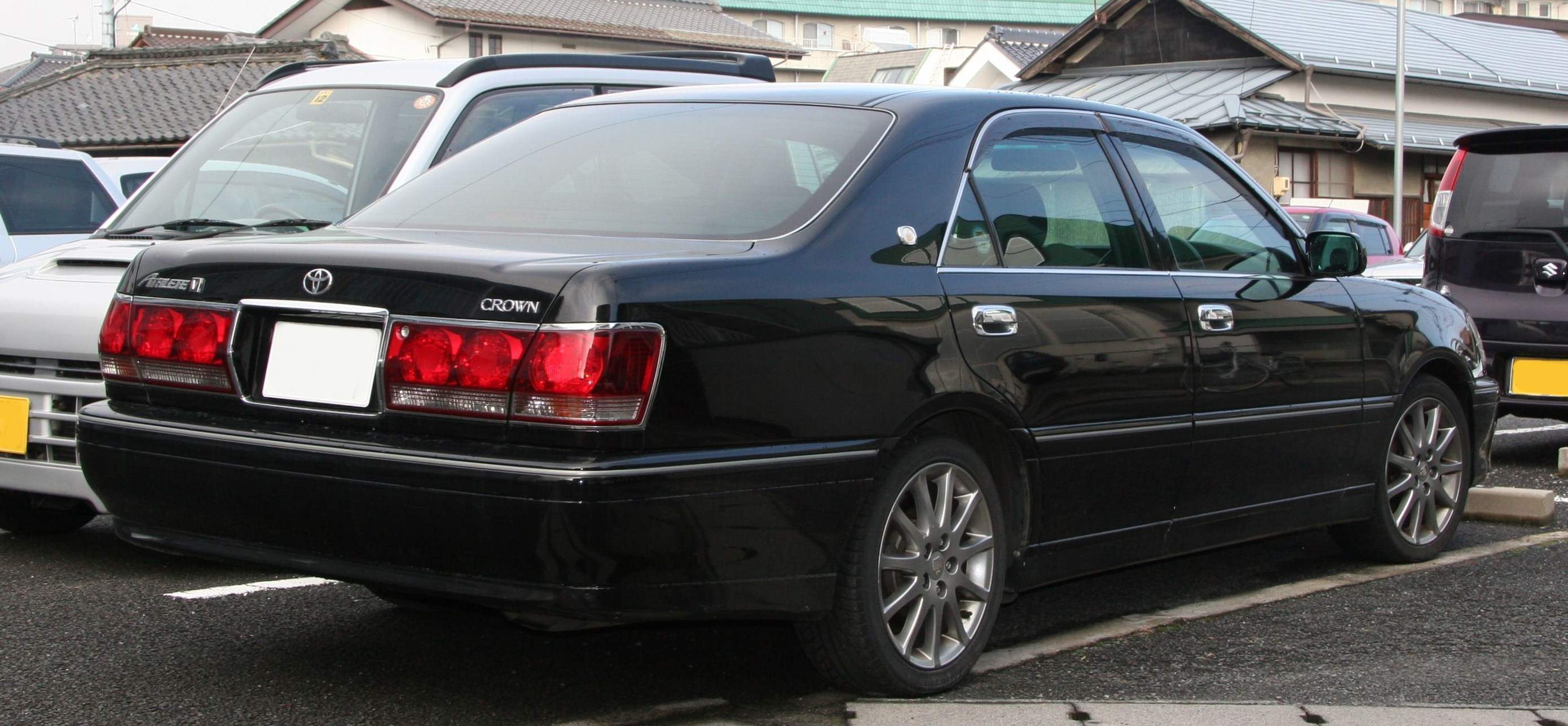
2001–2003 Crown Athlete V (JZS171, Japan)

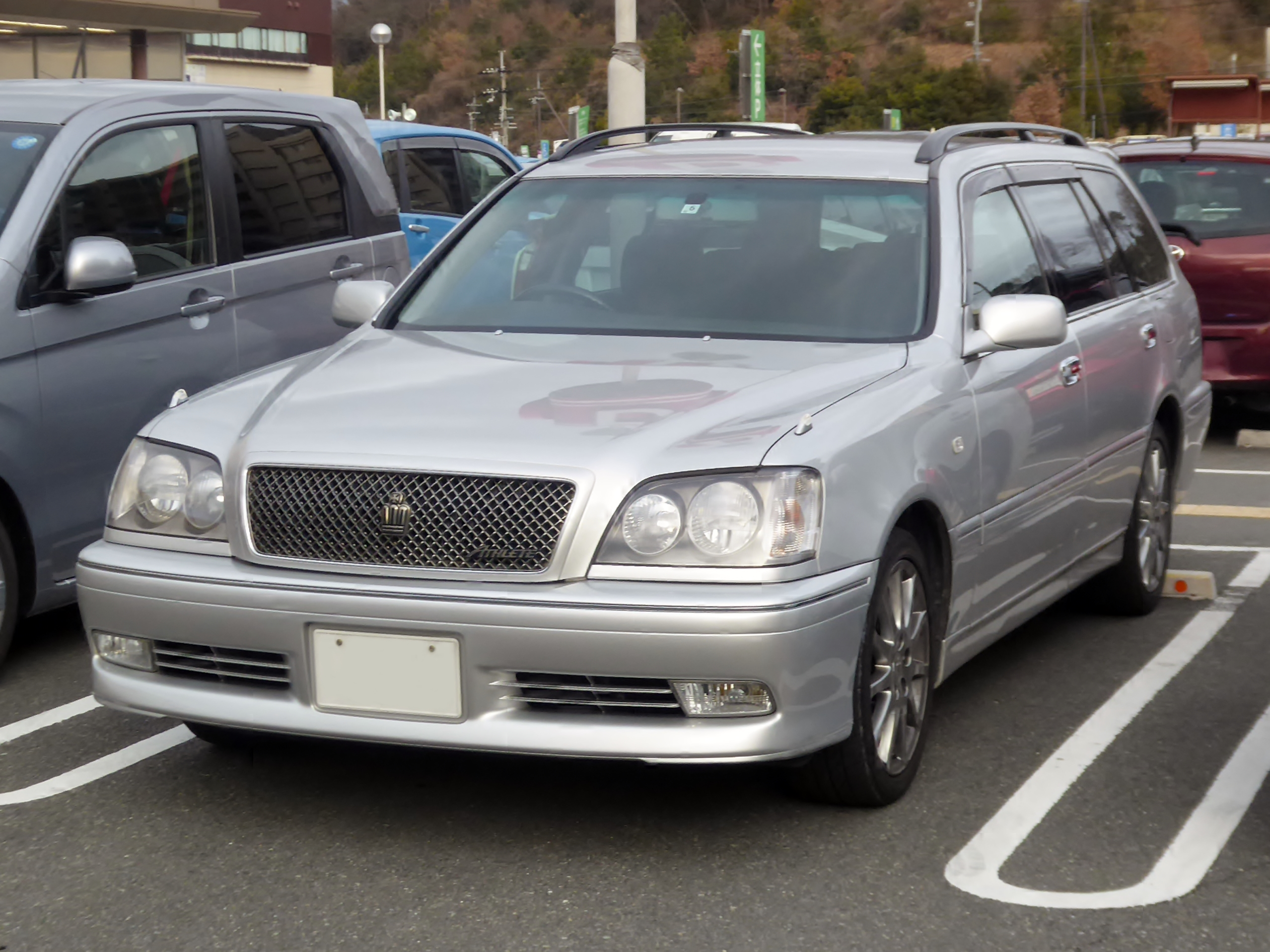
2001–2003 Crown Estate Athlete (JZS171W, Japan)

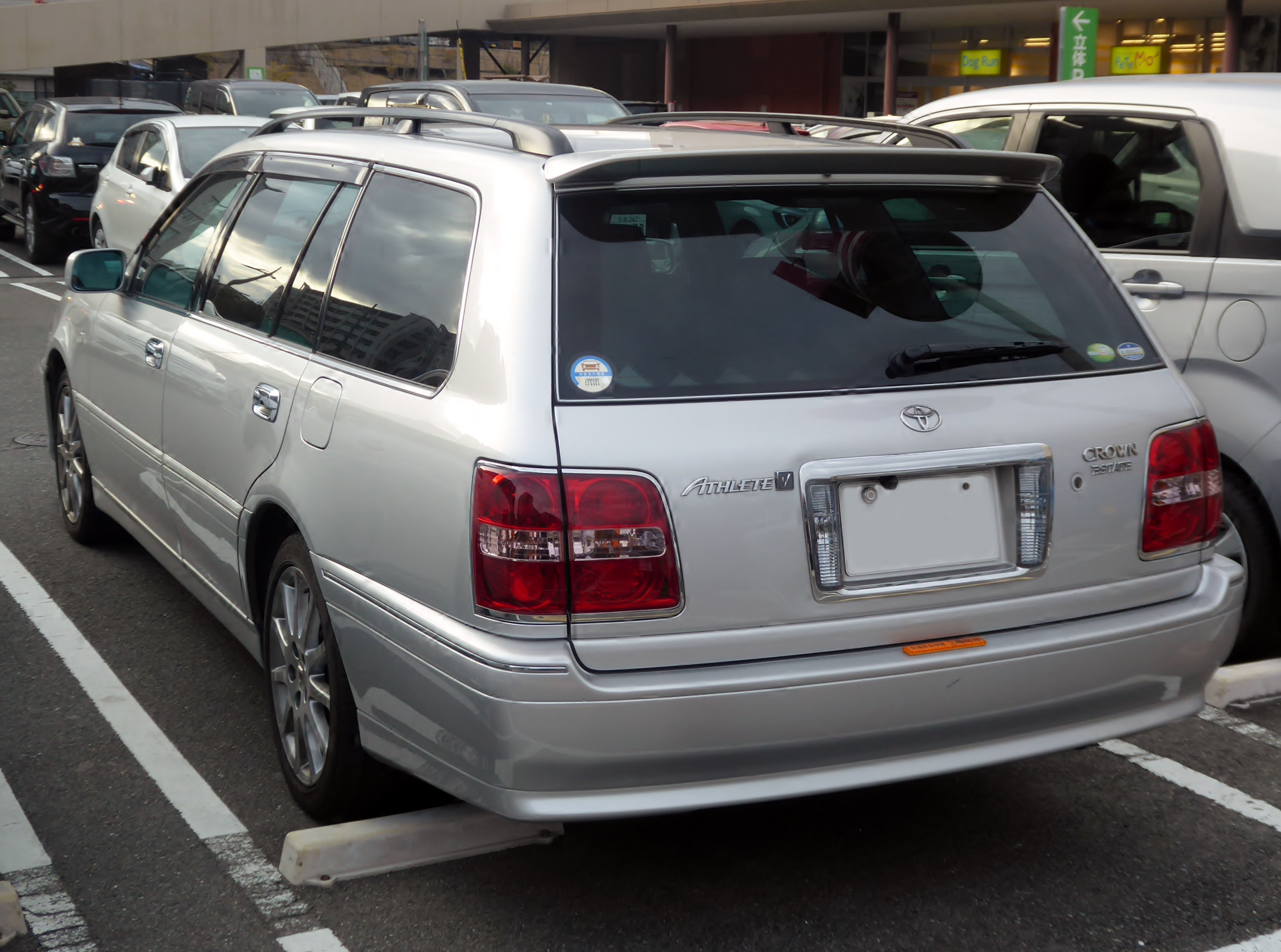
2001–2003 Crown Estate Athlete (JZS171W, Japan)

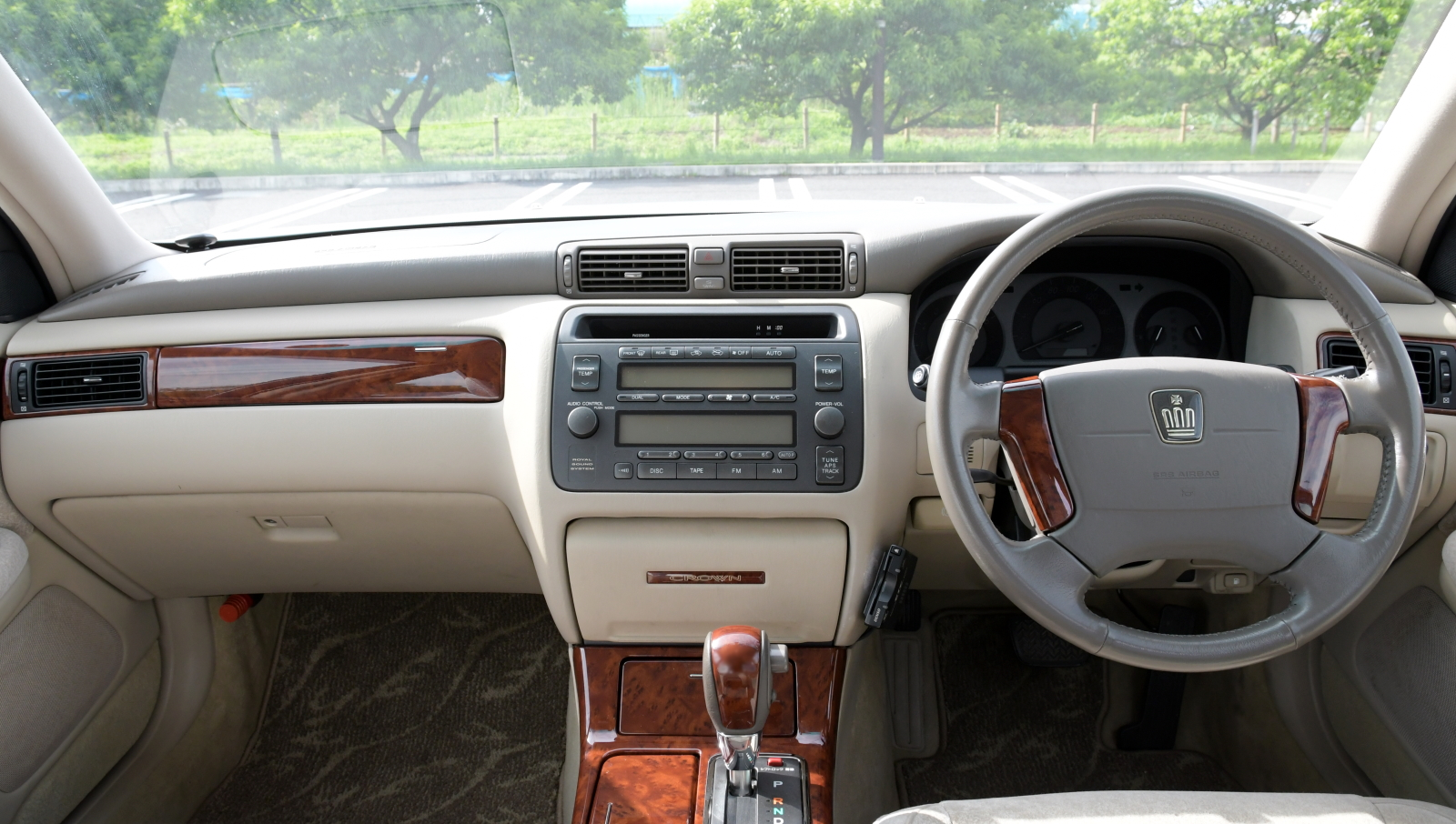
Interior

== Twelfth generation (S180; 2003) ==
Twelfth generation
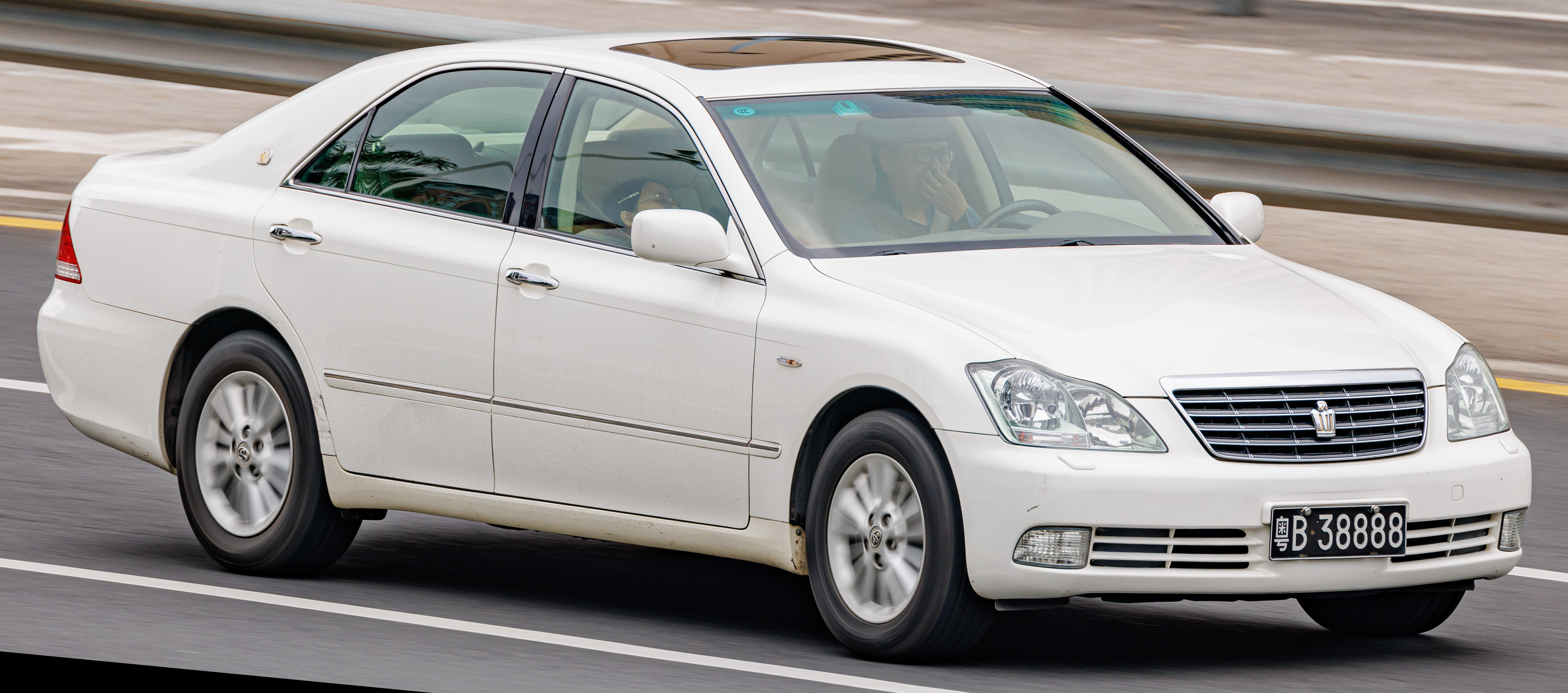
- Toyota Crown Royal Saloon S180 (China; pre-facelift)

Overview
- Model code: S180
- Production: 2003–2008; 2005–2009 (China)
- Assembly: Japan: Toyota, Aichi (Motomachi plant); Tahara, Aichi (Tahara plant); China: Tianjin (TFTM)

Body and chassis
- Body style: 4-door sedan
- Layout: Front-engine, rear-wheel-drive; Front-engine, four-wheel-drive
- Platform: Toyota N platform
- Related: Toyota Crown Majesta (S180); Lexus GS (S190)

Powertrain
- Engine: 2.5 L 4GR-FSE V6; 2.5 L 5GR-FE V6 (China); 3.0 L 3GR-FSE V6; 3.0 L 3GR-FE V6 (China); 3.5 L 2GR-FSE V6
- Transmission: 5-speed automatic; 6-speed automatic

Dimensions
- Wheelbase: 2,850 mm (112.2 in)
- Length: 4,855 mm (191.1 in)
- Width: 1,780 mm (70.1 in)
- Height: 1,470 mm (57.9 in)
- Curb weight: 1,620–1,700 kg (3,571.5–3,747.9 lb)

The S180 model of the Crown, released in late 2003, was based on the Zero Crown concept car. The engine was changed to a V6 for the new Royal and Athlete models, while the Crown Majesta used the V8 only, now in 4.3-liter form with 4WD optional. The new engines gave more performance while also giving better fuel economy. Left-hand drive Crowns became available for the first time since 2001 with this generation, although they were produced exclusively in China by Tianjin FAW Toyota Motor for sale in the domestic market. Radar Pre-Collision System added a single digital camera to improve the accuracy of collision forecast and warning and control levels. In television commercials in Japan a song was written by composer John Harle titled "How should I my true love know?". G-BOOK was introduced in May 2006.

Compared with the previous model, this model was increased by 70 mm (2.8 in) in the wheelbase and 15 mm (0.6 in) in body width. These changes gave it the largest interior size among its contemporaries, more than the Mercedes-Benz S-Class or BMW 7 Series. The slightly shorter and narrower versions with a 2.0 L engine are no longer offered as a Crown, with the Crown Comfort having assumed this lower-taxed market position in Japan.

The S180 received a small facelift in October 2005, with redesigned taillights and with the Crown Athlete receiving "smoked" head- and taillights. The Royal series also received smoked headlights and a more sculpted grille. The Athlete was also fitted with a new top engine, the 315 PS (232 kW), 3.5-litre 2GR-FSE, which also qualified as a low-emissions vehicle.

The S170 series Crown Estate was continued alongside the S180 sedans, still continuing to use the older inline six-cylinder engines. It was eventually replaced by the luxury-oriented Toyota Alphard for load carrying duties and multiple passengers.

=== Gallery ===
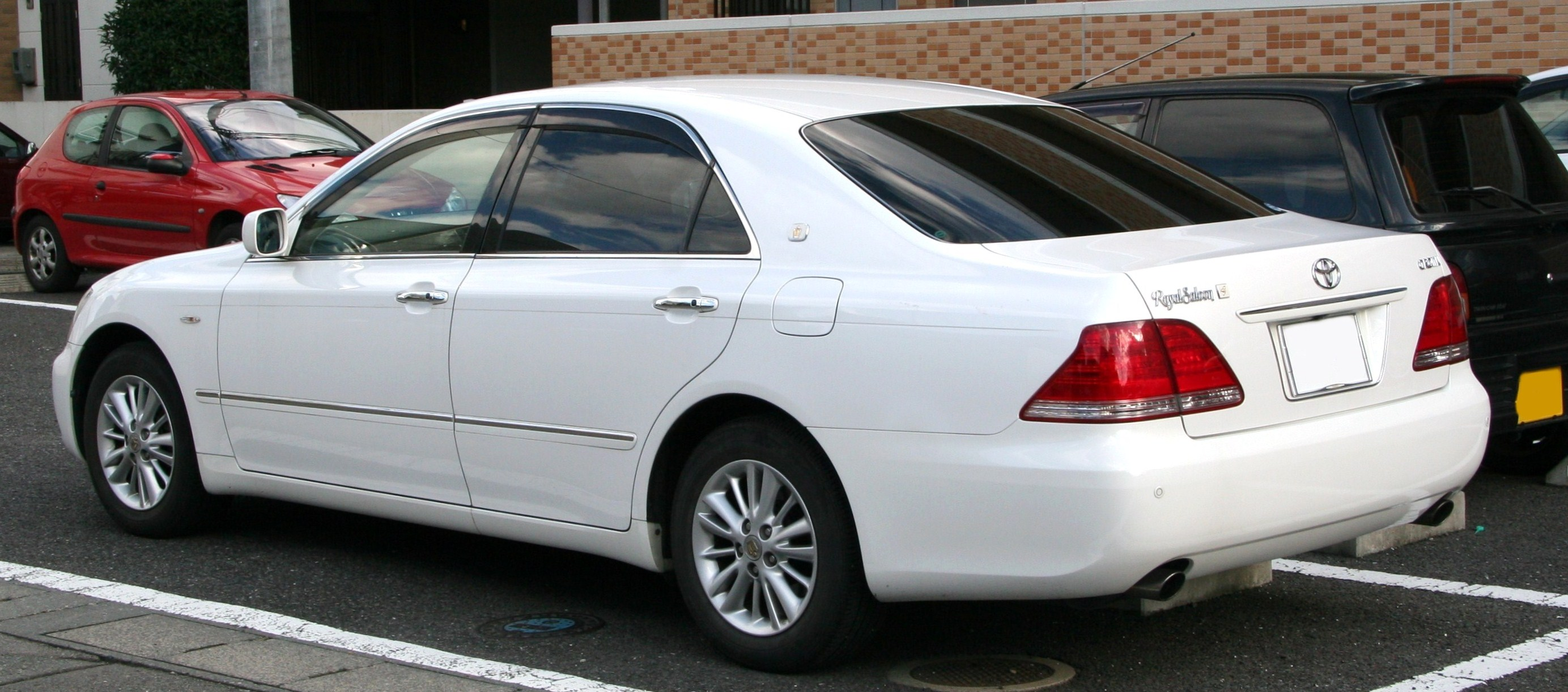
Crown Royal Saloon (Japan; pre-facelift)

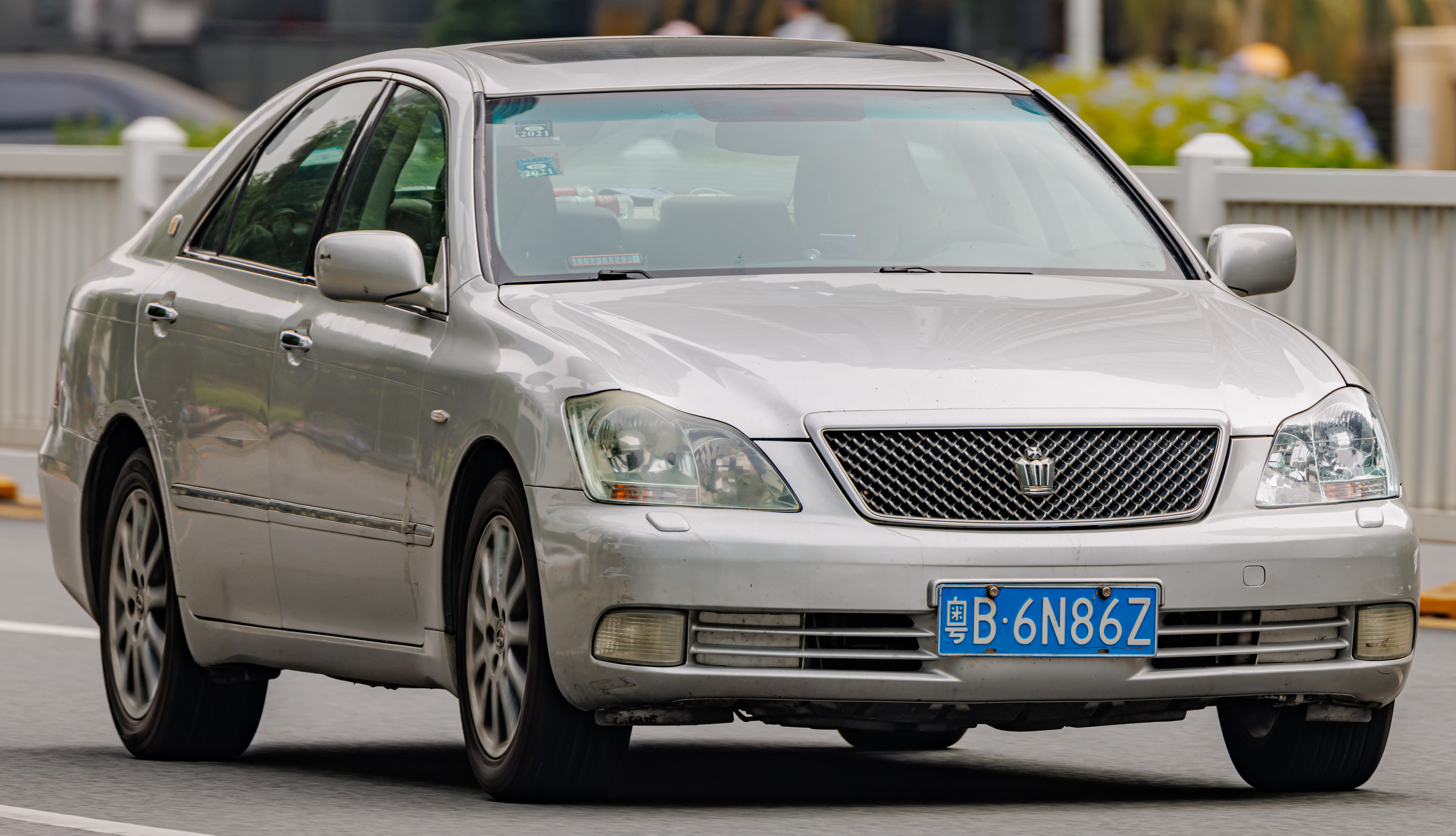
Crown Athlete (China; pre-facelift)

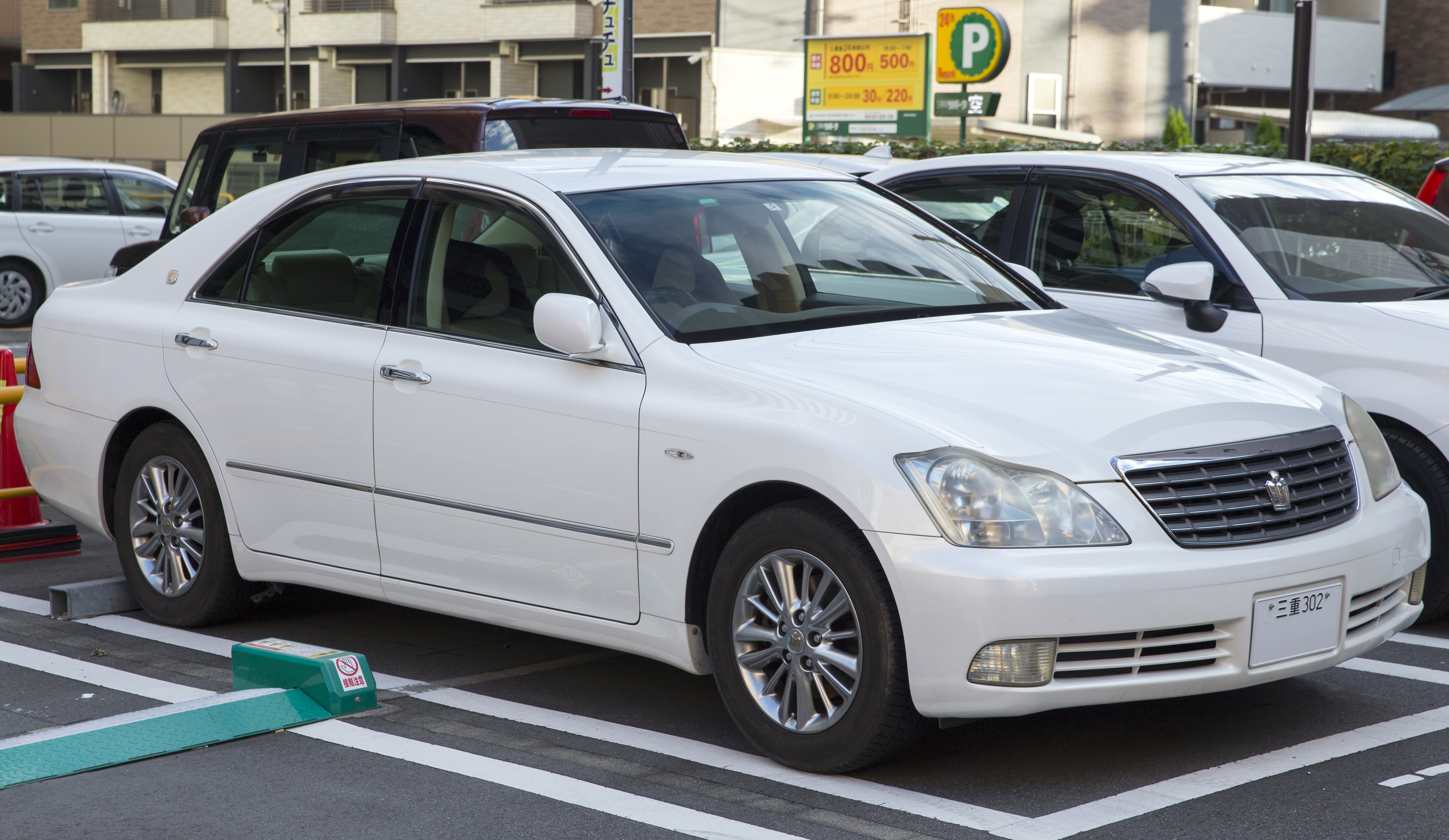
Crown Royal Saloon (Japan; facelift)

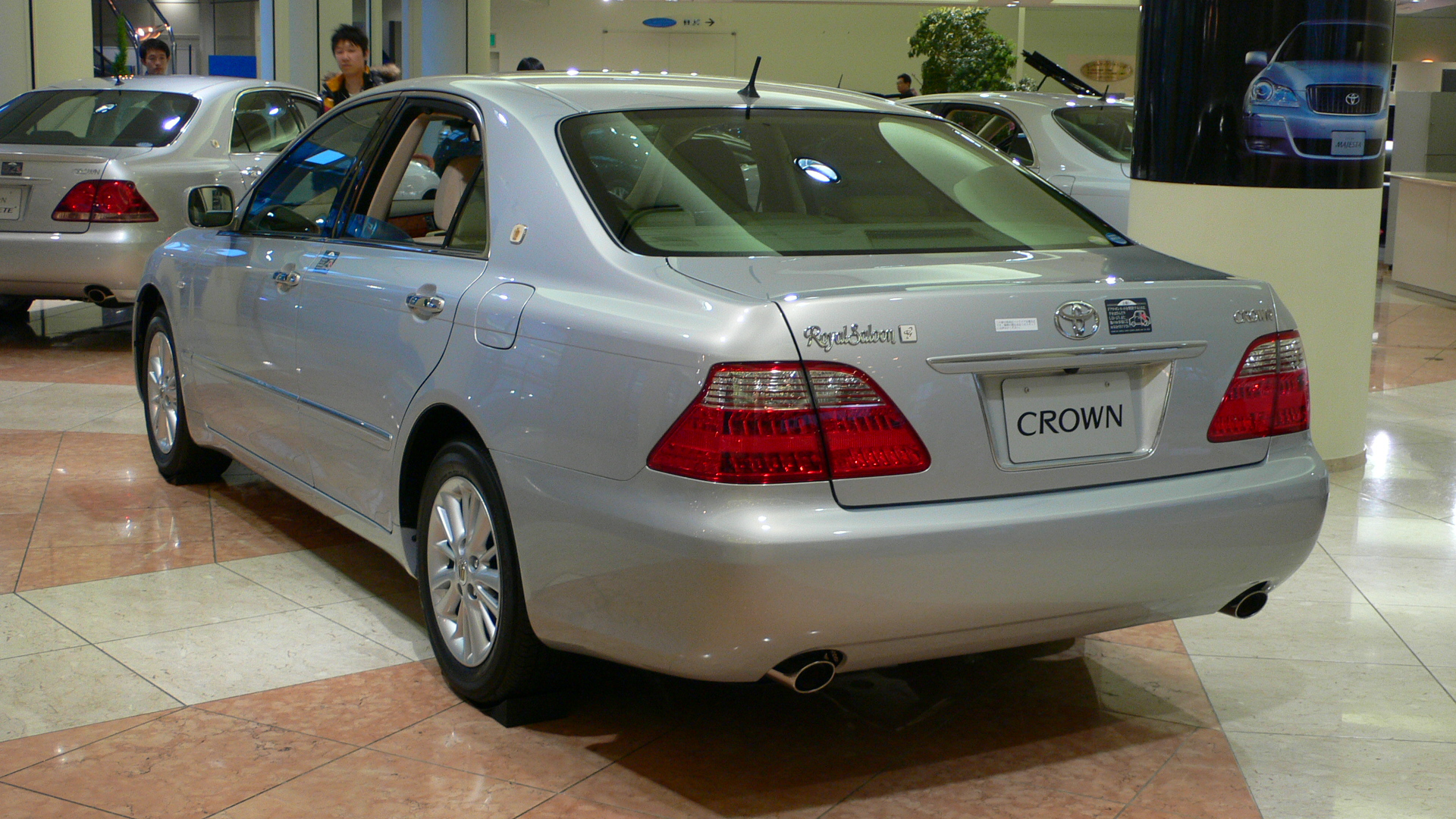
Crown Royal Saloon G (GRS182, Japan; facelift)

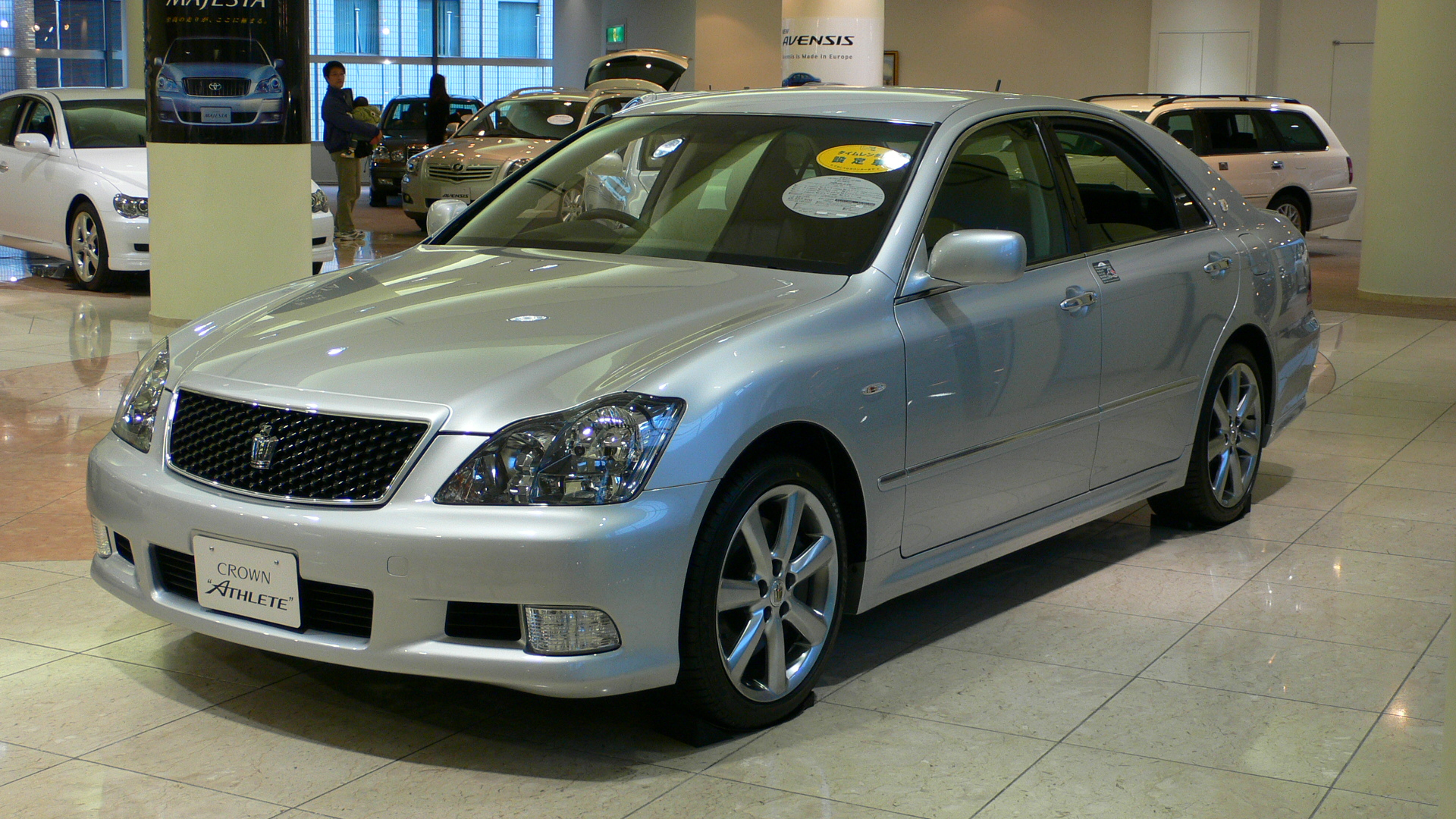
Crown Athlete (GRS180, Japan; facelift)

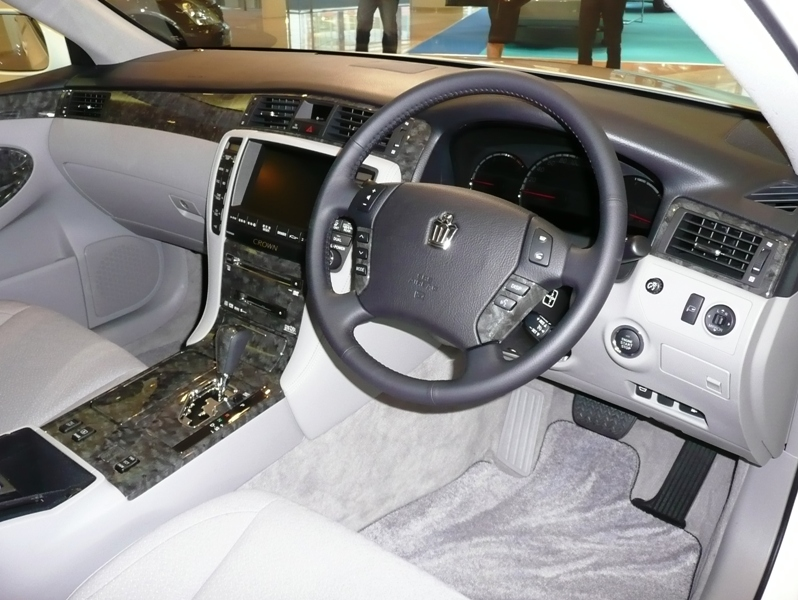
Interior

== Thirteenth generation (S200; 2008) ==
Thirteenth generation
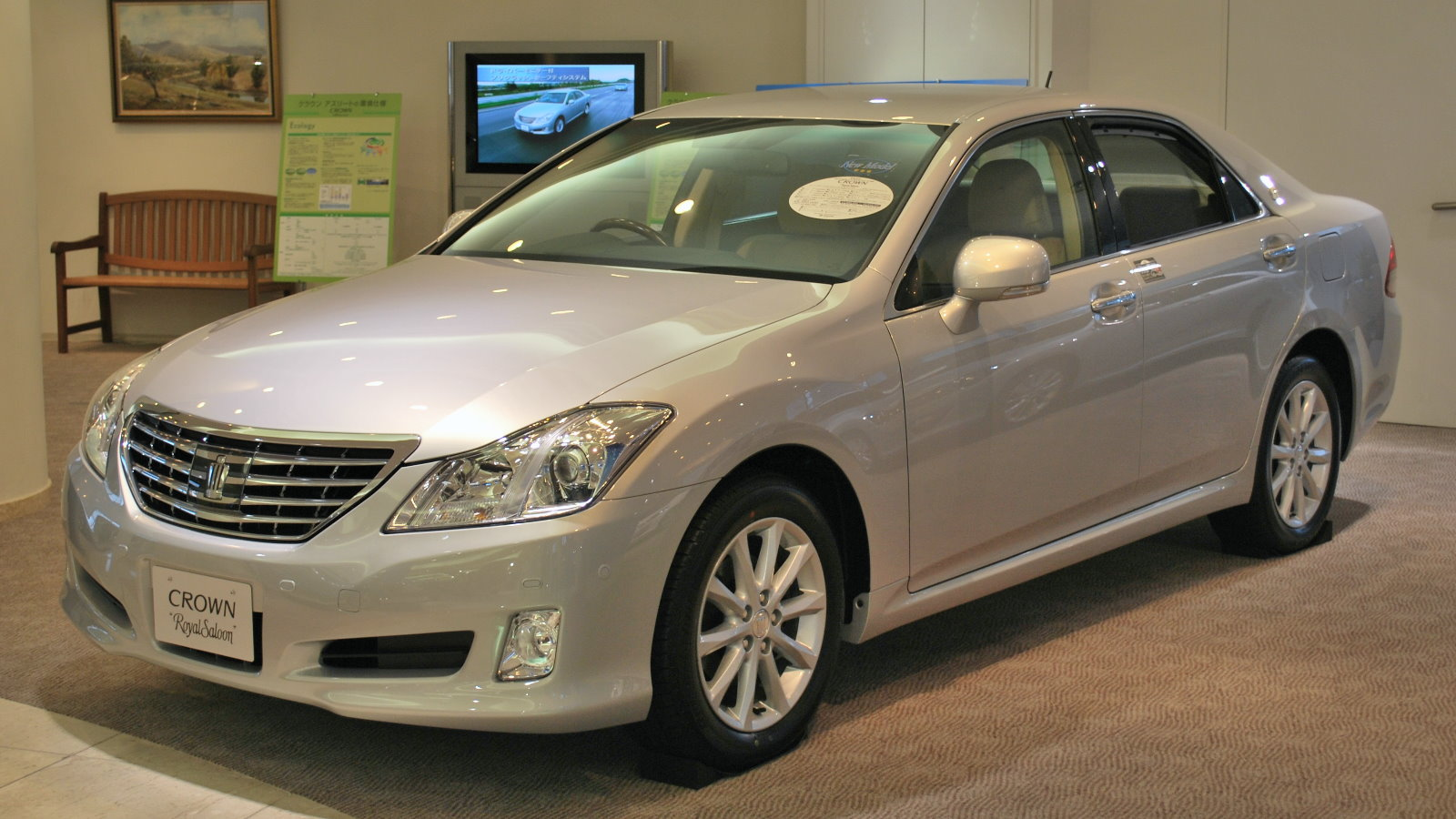
- Toyota Crown Royal Saloon G (GRS202, Japan; pre-facelift)

Overview
- Model code: S200
- Production: 2008–2012; 2009–2015 (China)
- Assembly: Japan: Susono, Shizuoka (Higashi Fuji plant); Toyota, Aichi (Motomachi plant); China: Tianjin (TFTM)

Body and chassis
- Body style: 4-door sedan
- Layout: Front-engine, rear-wheel-drive; Front-engine, four-wheel-drive
- Platform: Toyota N platform
- Related: Toyota Crown Majesta (S200)

Powertrain
- Engine: 2.5 L 4GR-FSE V6; 2.5 L 5GR-FE V6 (China); 3.0 L 3GR-FSE V6; 3.0 L 3GR-FE V6 (China); 3.5 L 2GR-FSE V6 (Crown Athlete GRS204); 3.5 L 2GR-FXE (Hybrid) V6; 4.3 L 3UZ-FE V8 (China); 4.6 L 1UR-FSE V8
- Transmission: 6-speed automatic; 8-speed automatic; eCVT automatic (hybrid)

Dimensions
- Wheelbase: 2,850 mm (112.2 in)
- Length: 4,870 mm (191.7 in)
- Width: 1,795 mm (70.7 in)
- Height: 1,470 mm (57.9 in)
- Curb weight: 1,792 kg (3,951 lb); 1,863 kg (4,107 lb) (For TRD)

This generation of the Crown was available in 4 different trim levels: the Crown Royal series which is a more comfortable and luxurious car; the Crown Athlete series, which is similar to the Royal series but has more aggressive styling and sporty features; the Crown Majesta series with different styling and more luxurious features than the Royal series; and the Crown Hybrid series which is a trim level designated for the Hybrid Synergy Drive V6 drivetrain. The larger 4.6 L 1UR-FSE V8 engine incurred a higher road tax liability.

The Crown Athlete has been tested to do 0–100 km/h in under 6 seconds, while the Crown Hybrid has been estimated to take 5.4 seconds due to the additional power of the hybrid motor. The mechanically similar Lexus GS 450H Hybrid (GWS191) outputs 253 kW (339 bhp).

In February 2010, the Crown underwent a facelift which included a less "smiley" front grille, new headlamps and taillights, new bumpers and some technical revisions. Power of the 2.5-litre engine was reduced somewhat, but this improved fuel economy and lowered emissions, while also allowing the car to run on regular gasoline.

The Crown Hybrid Concept was exhibited at the 2007 Tokyo Motor Show.

=== Innovation ===
- The Crown is one of the first vehicles to have a Navigation/Artificial Intelligence-Adaptive Variable Suspension System (NAVI/AI-AVS) 3 Dimensional Satellite Navigation System coupled with G-BOOK and boasts many features that have not been developed by other luxury car makers. This system can adjust the damper firmness for corners based on map data and change transmission gear shift timings and engine braking for merging on and off highways and approaching tollbooths.
- First Toyota vehicle with active noise control.
- World first Collision avoidance system (PCS) with front-side millimeter wave radar to detect potential side collisions primarily at intersections or when another vehicle crosses the center line. The latest version tilts the rear seat upward, placing the passenger in a more ideal crash position if it detects a front or rear impact.
- World first PCS Collision avoidance system with GPS-navigation linked brake assist function. The system, which is designed to determine if the driver is late in decelerating at an approaching stop sign, would then sound an alert and can also pre-charge the brakes to provide optimum braking force if deemed necessary. This system works in certain Japanese cities and requires Japan specific road markings that are detected by a CCD camera.
- The Crown Hybrid Night View introduced the first pedestrian detection feature for an active Automotive night vision system. Toyota added a feature which highlights pedestrians and presents them in a box on a liquid-crystal display in front of the driver.
- Updated Driver Monitoring System for detecting whether the driver's eyes are properly open. It monitors the driver's eyes to detect the driver's level of wakefulness. This system is designed to work even if the driver is wearing sunglasses, and at night.
- World's first center airbag introduced in 2009.

=== Gallery ===
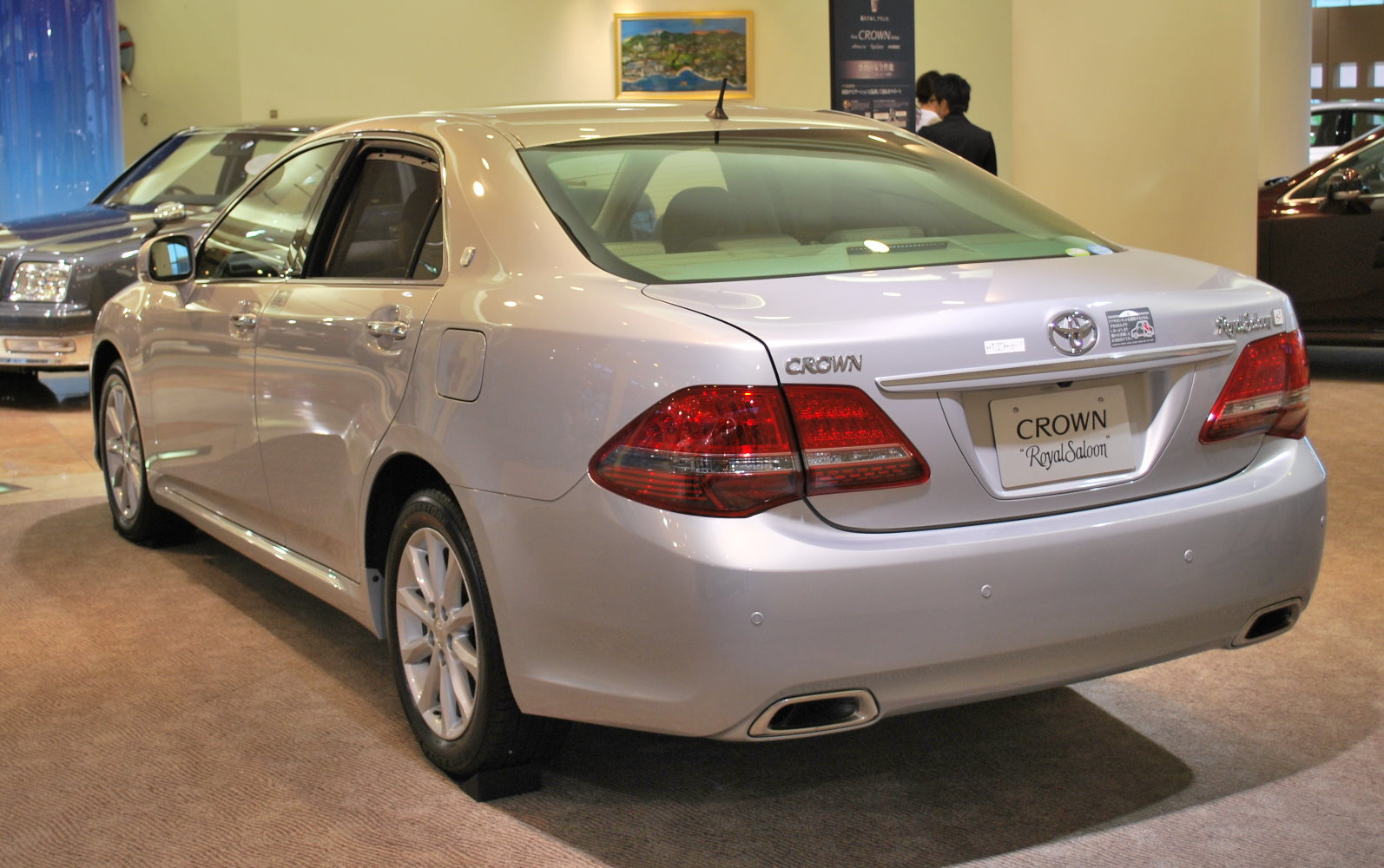
Crown Royal Saloon G (GRS202, Japan; pre-facelift)

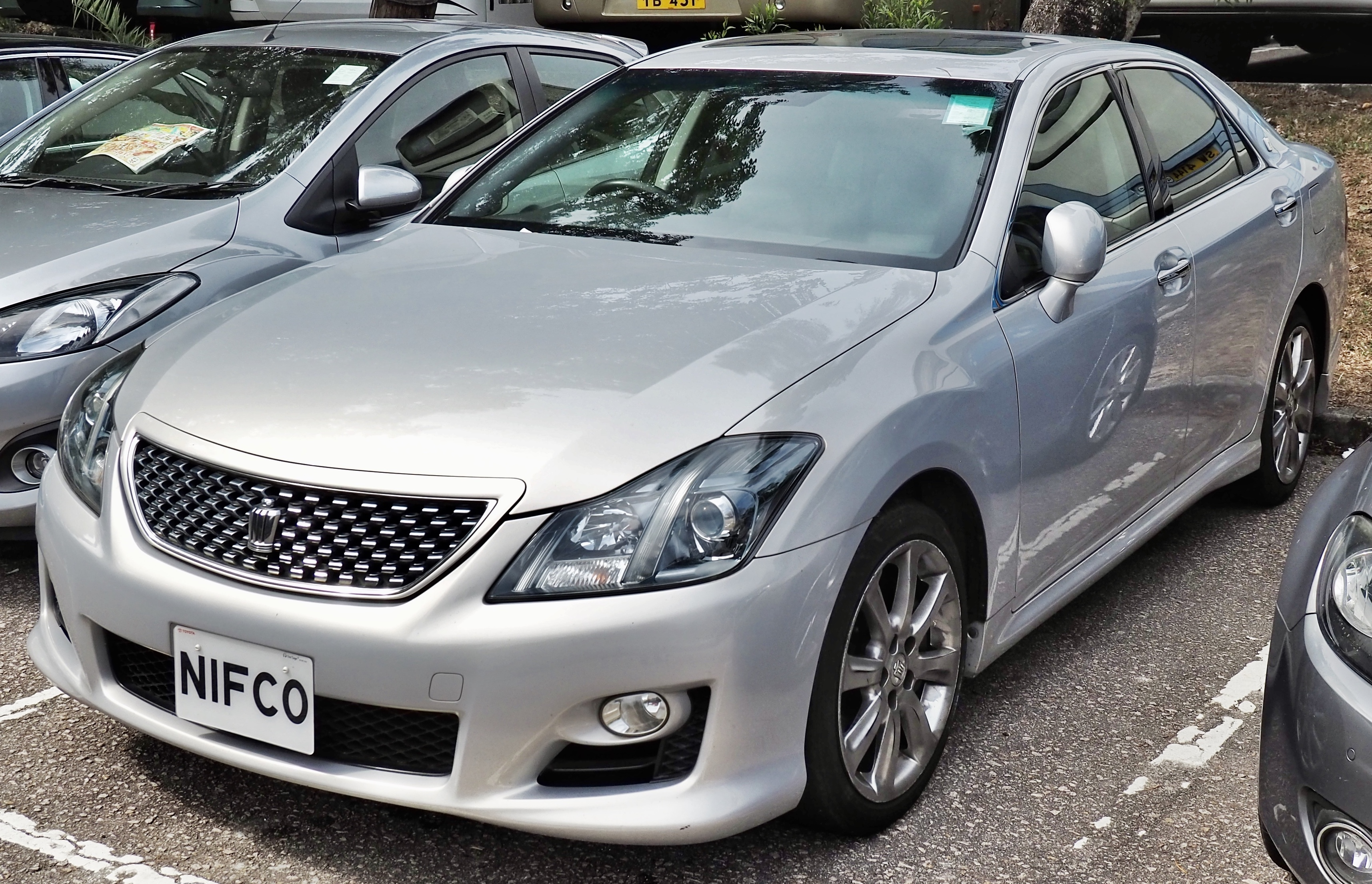
Crown Athlete (Japan; pre-facelift)

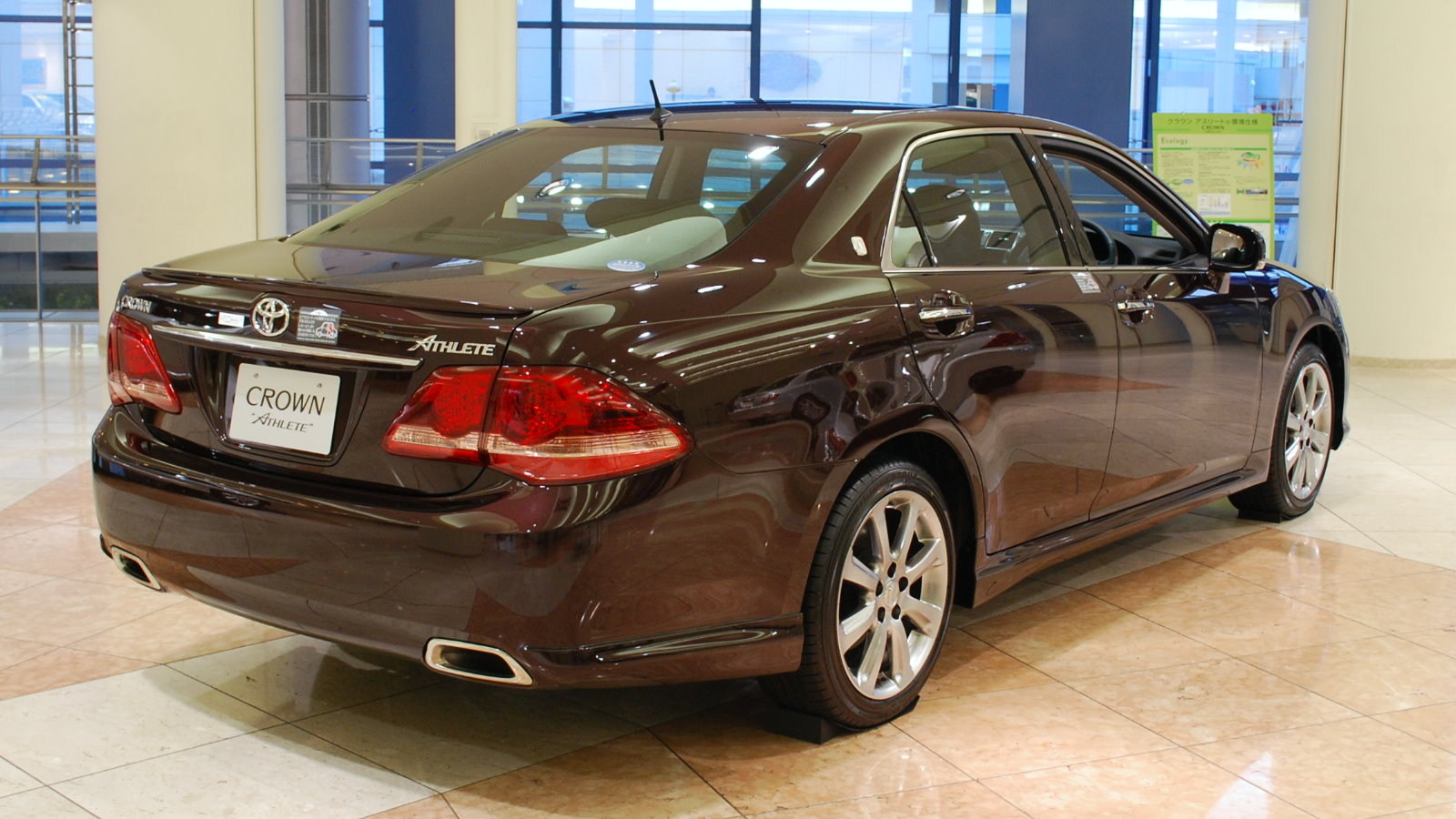
Crown Athlete (Japan; pre-facelift)

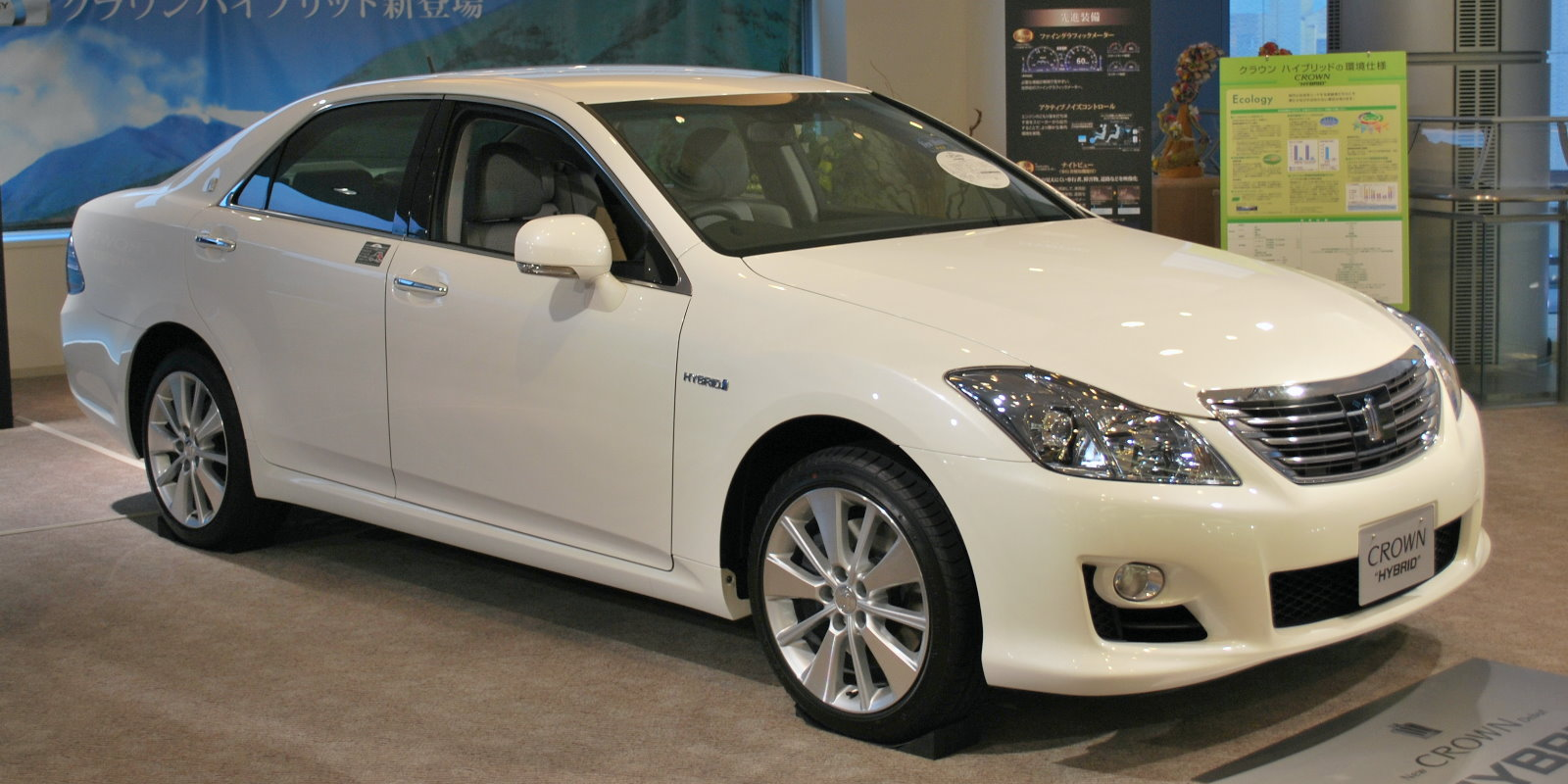
Crown Hybrid (GWS204, Japan; pre-facelift)

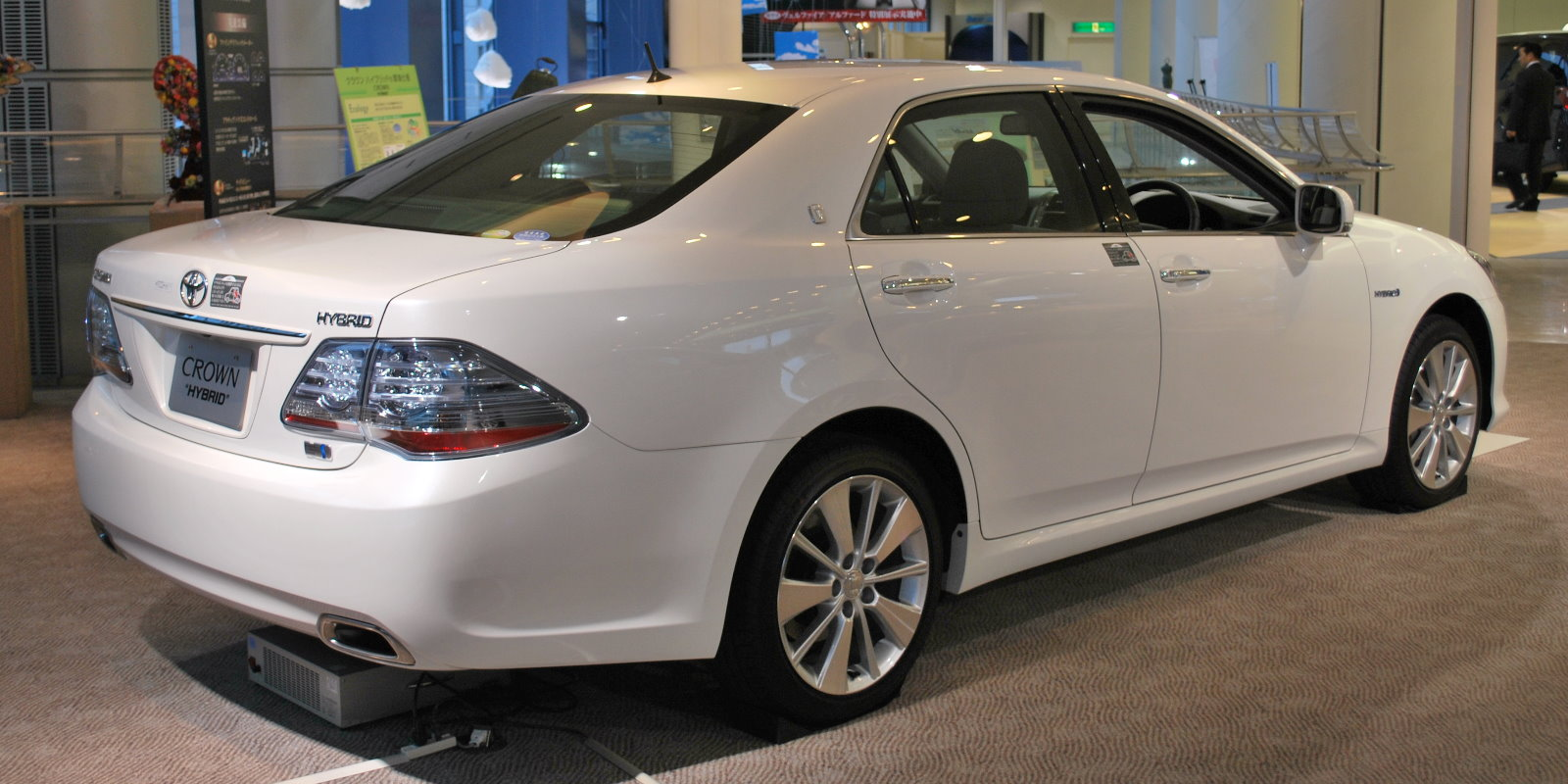
Crown Hybrid (GWS204, Japan; pre-facelift)

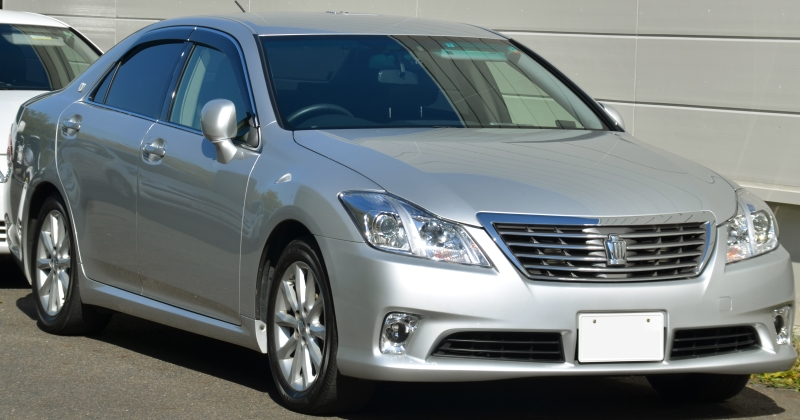
Crown Royal Saloon (Japan; facelift)

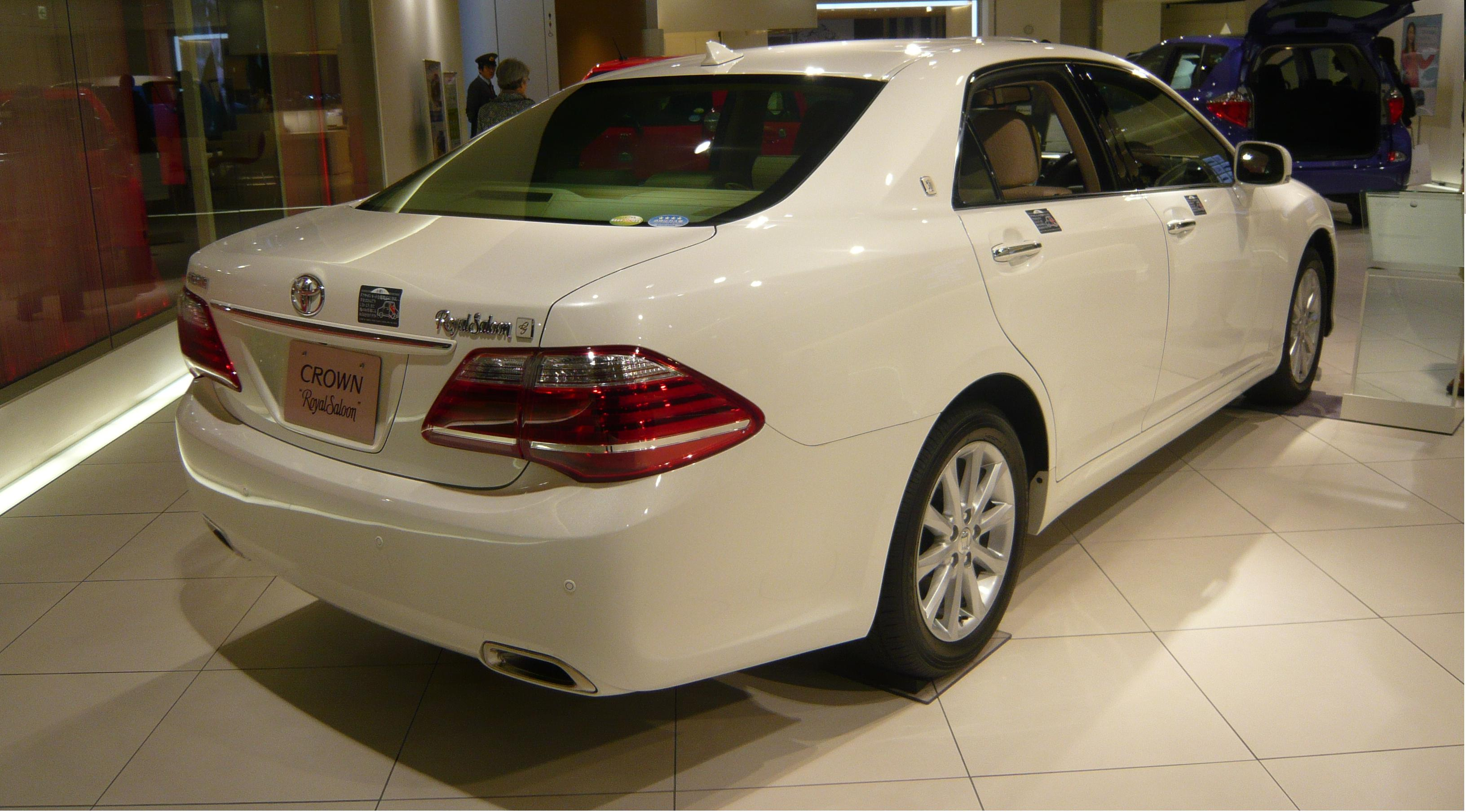
Crown Royal Saloon G (Japan; facelift)

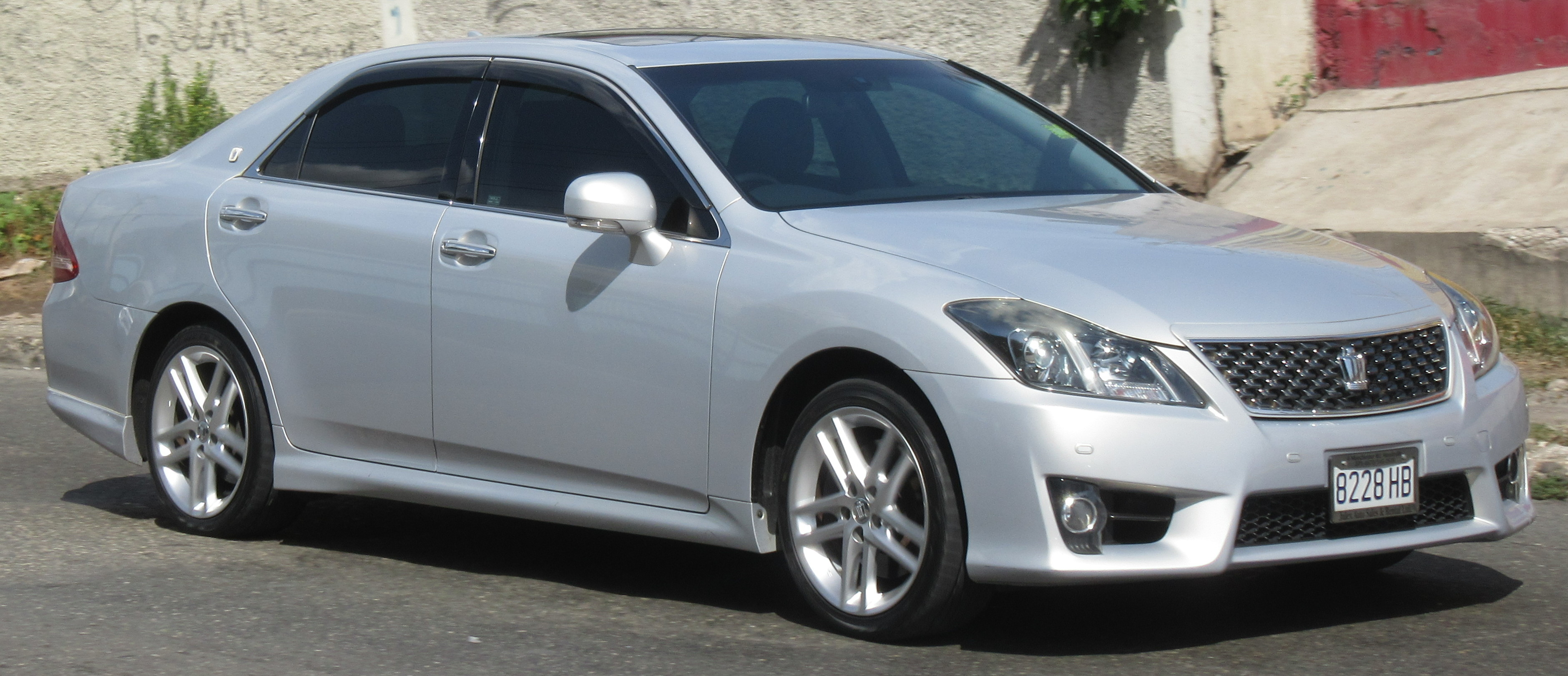
Crown Athlete (Japan; facelift)

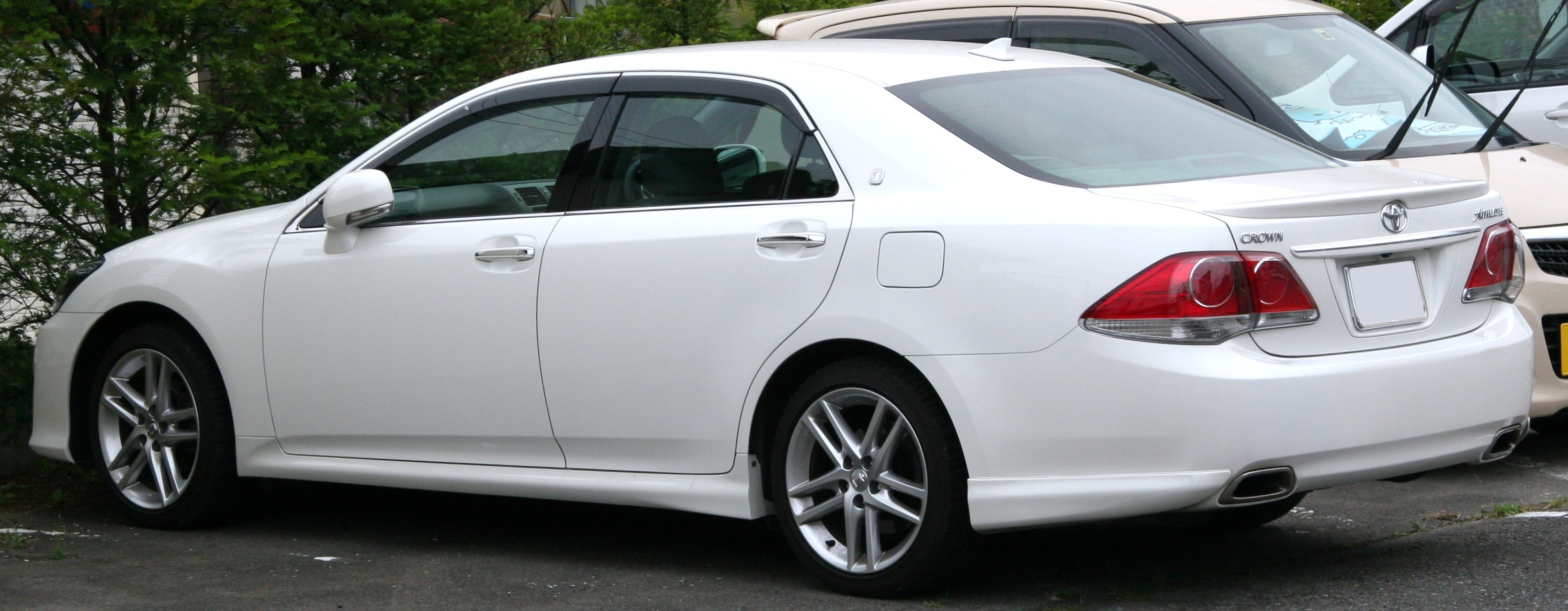
Crown Athlete (Japan; facelift)

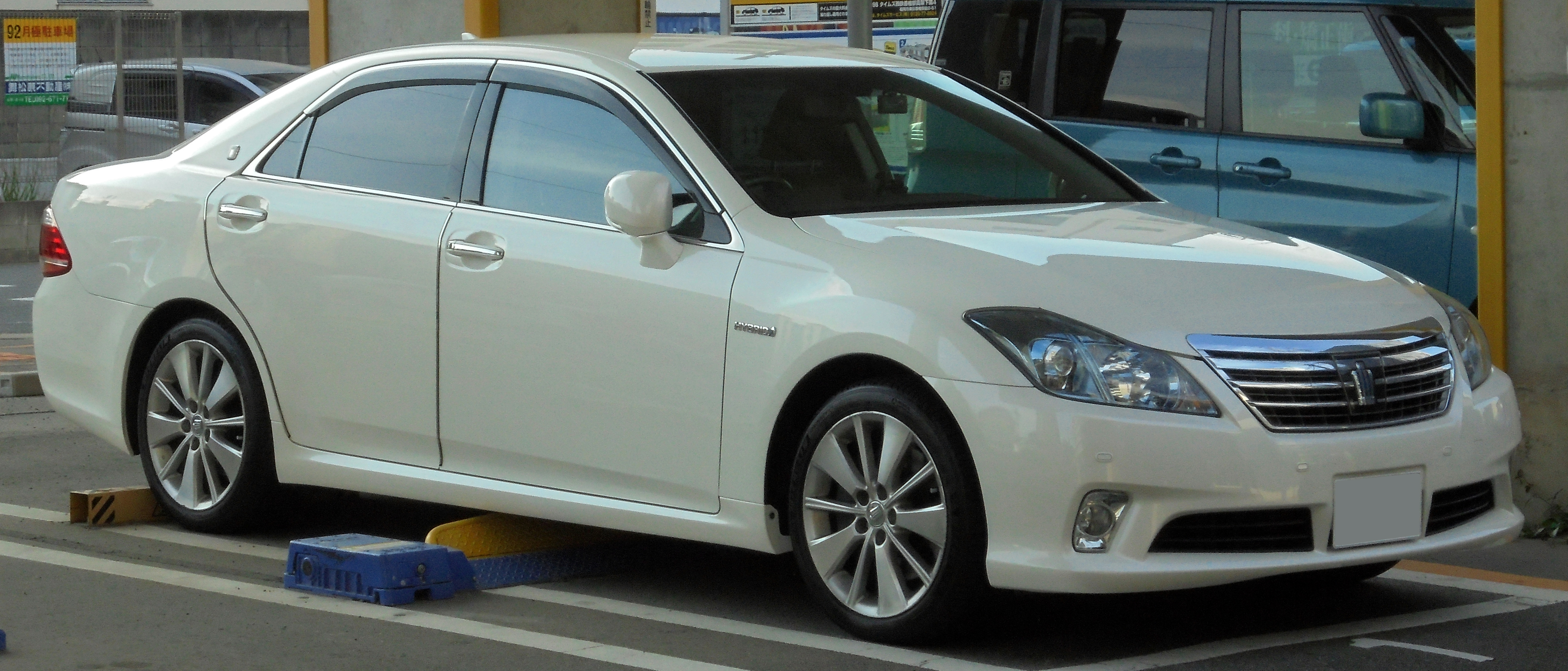
Crown Hybrid (GWS204, Japan; facelift)

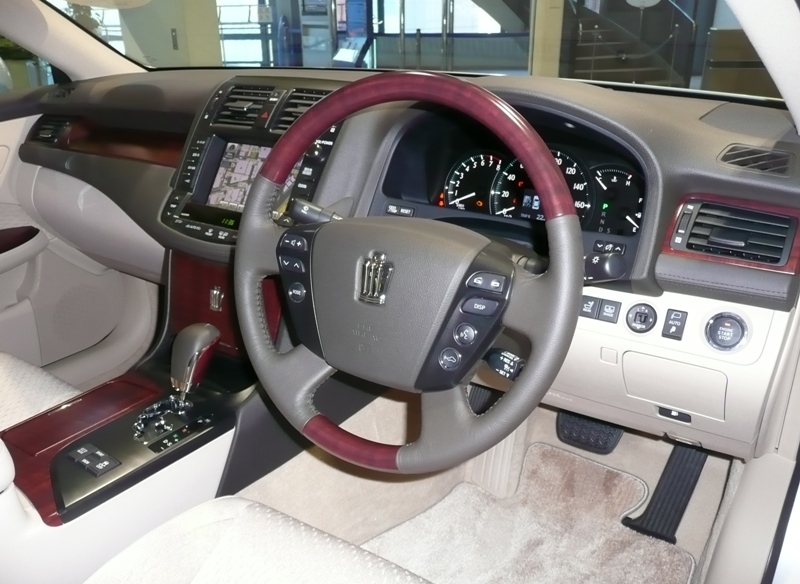
Interior

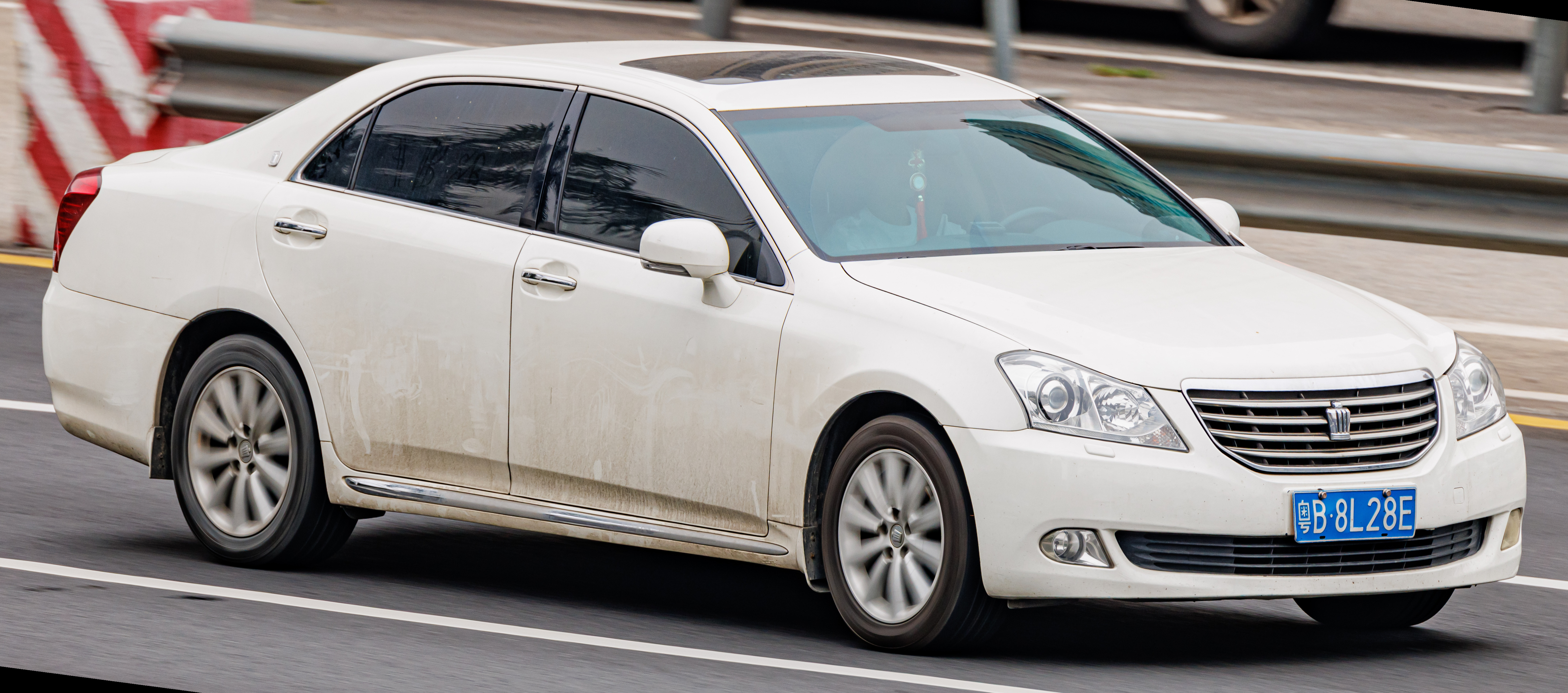
Crown S200 (2009–2012) in China

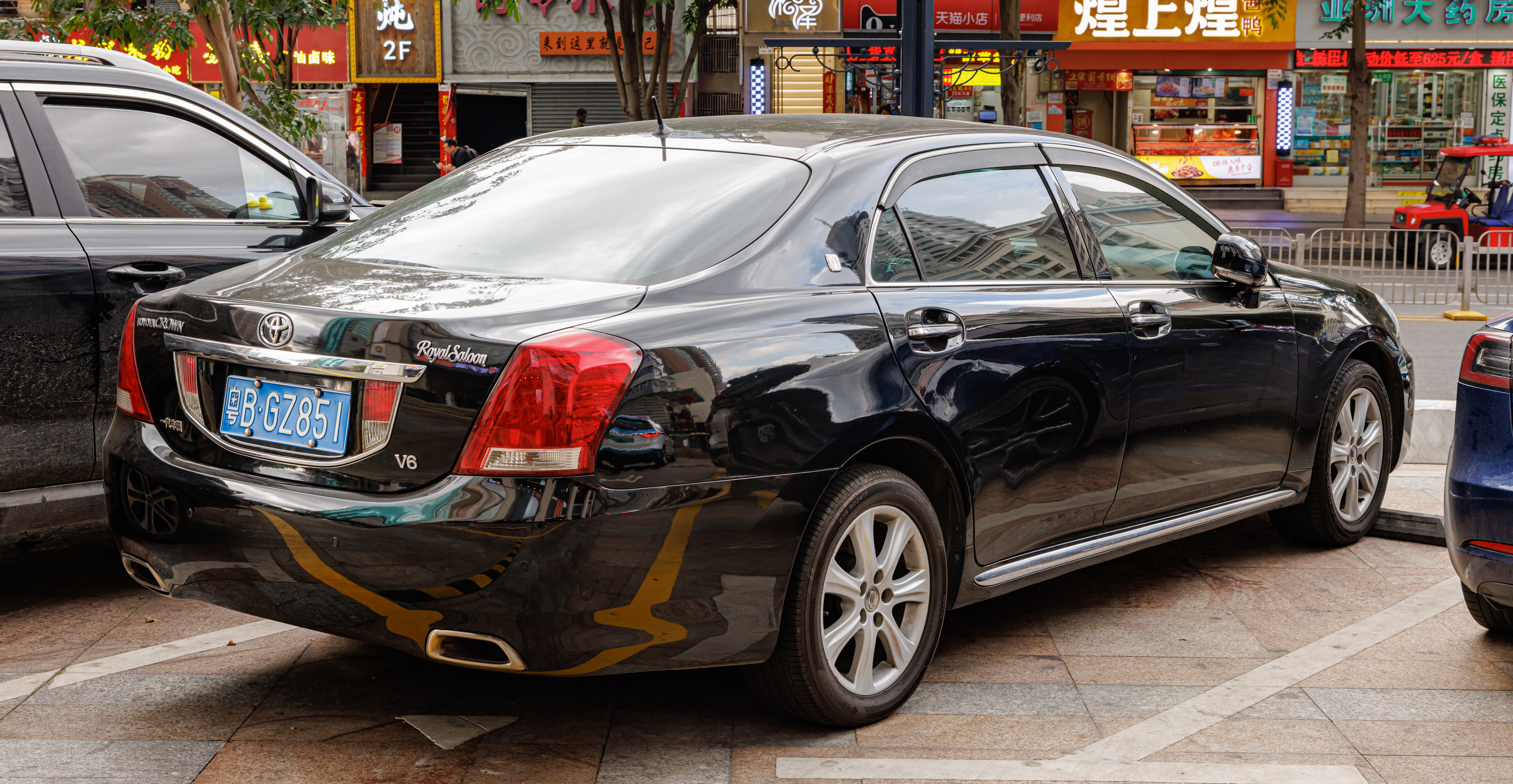
Crown Royal Saloon S200 (2009–2012) in China

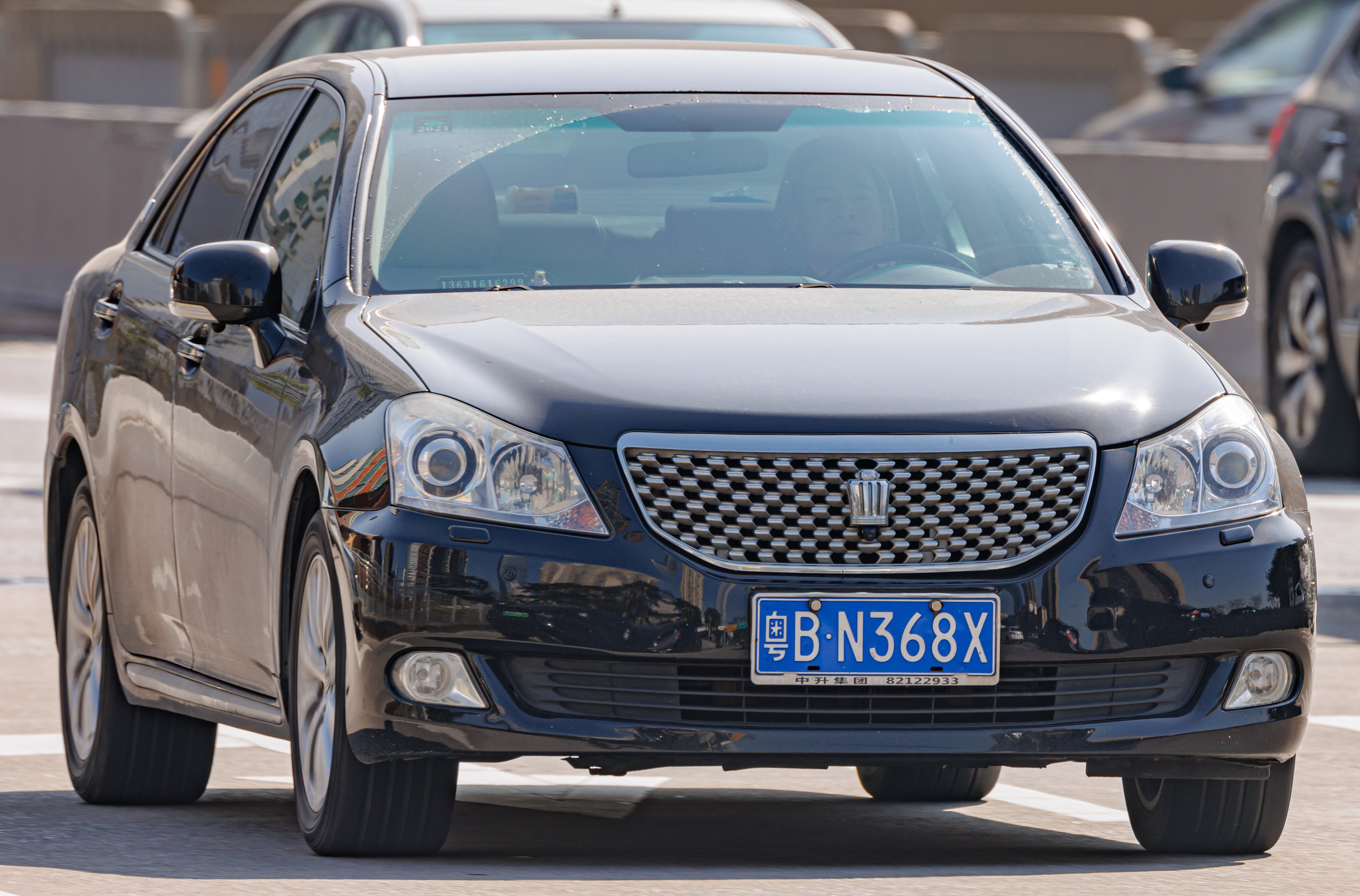
Crown Sport S200 (2011–2012) in China

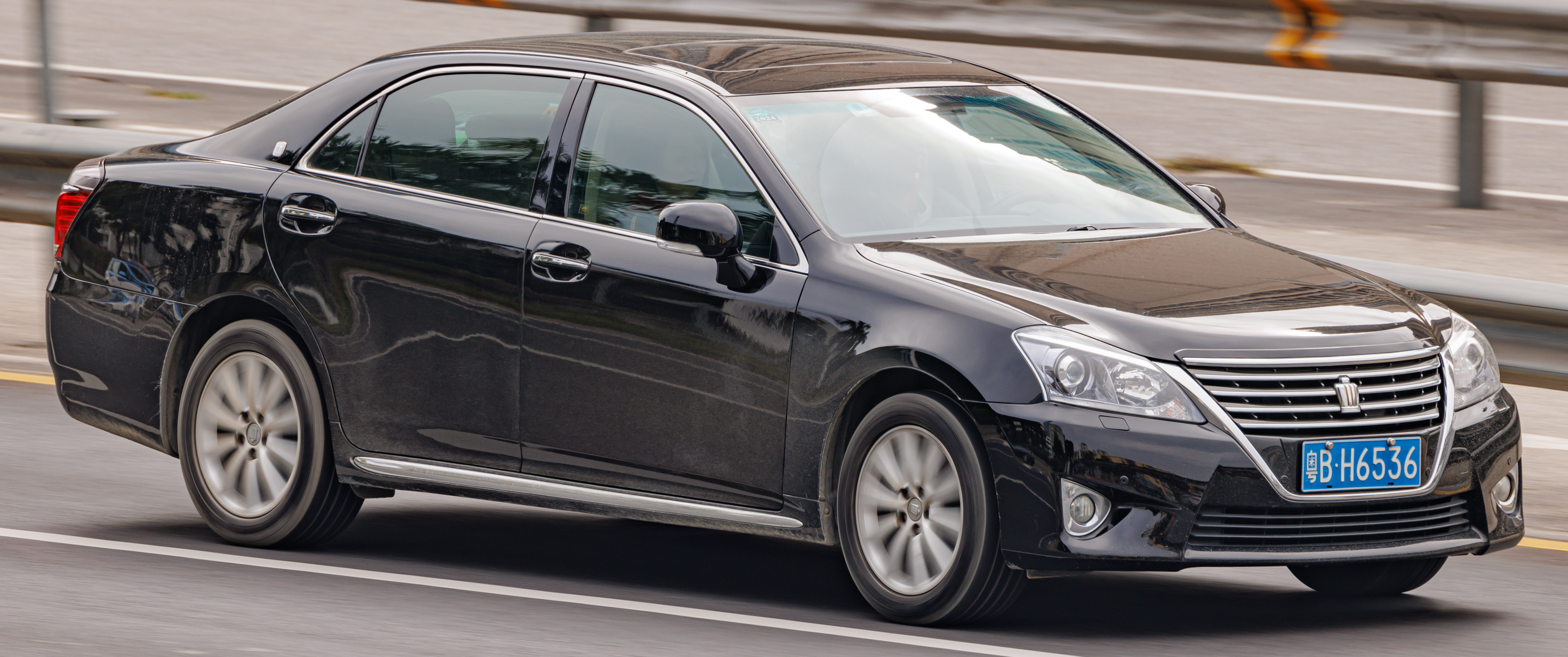
Crown S200 facelift (2012–2015) in China

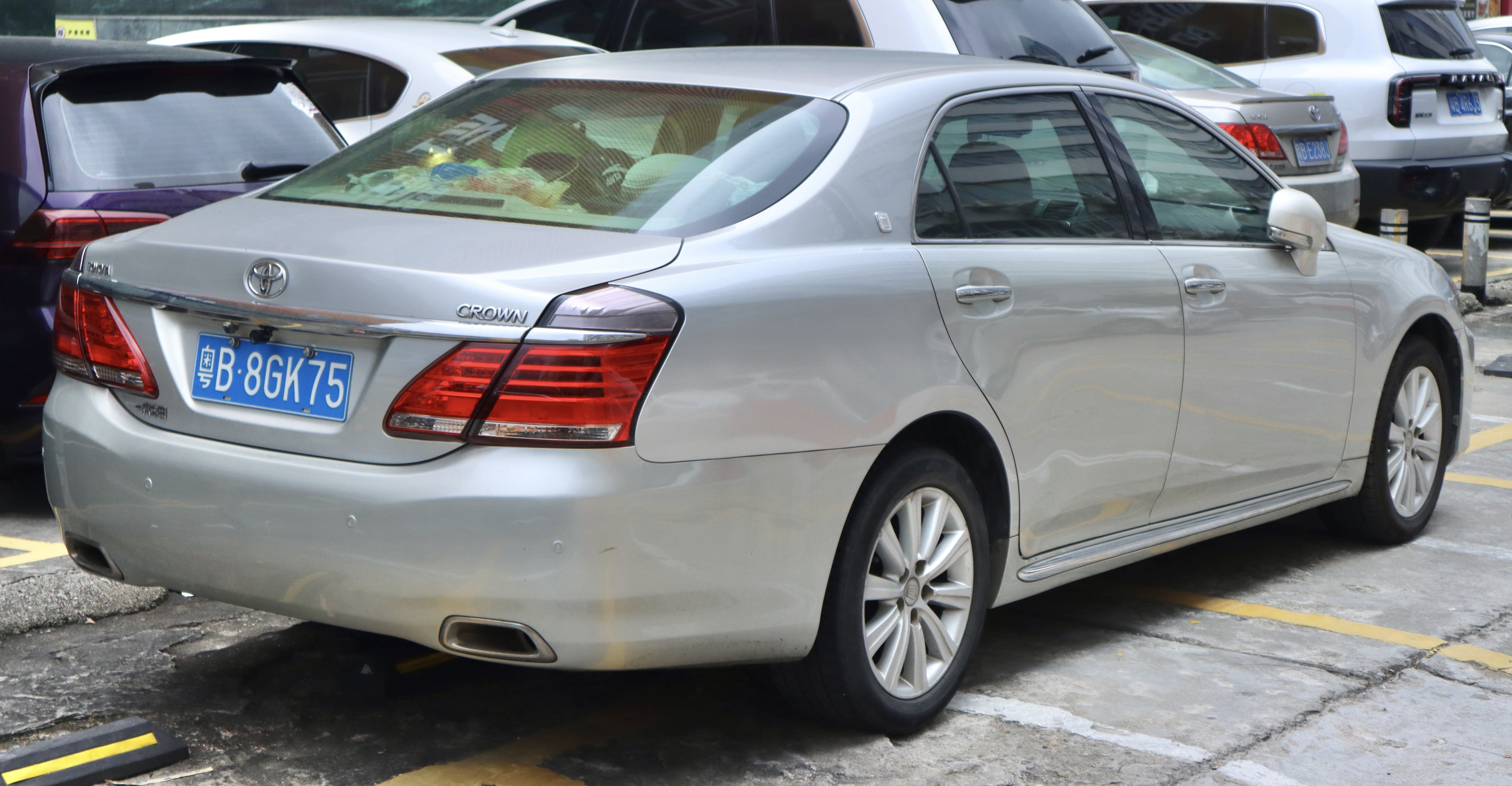
Crown S200 facelift (2012–2015) in China

== Fourteenth generation (S210; 2012) ==
Fourteenth generation
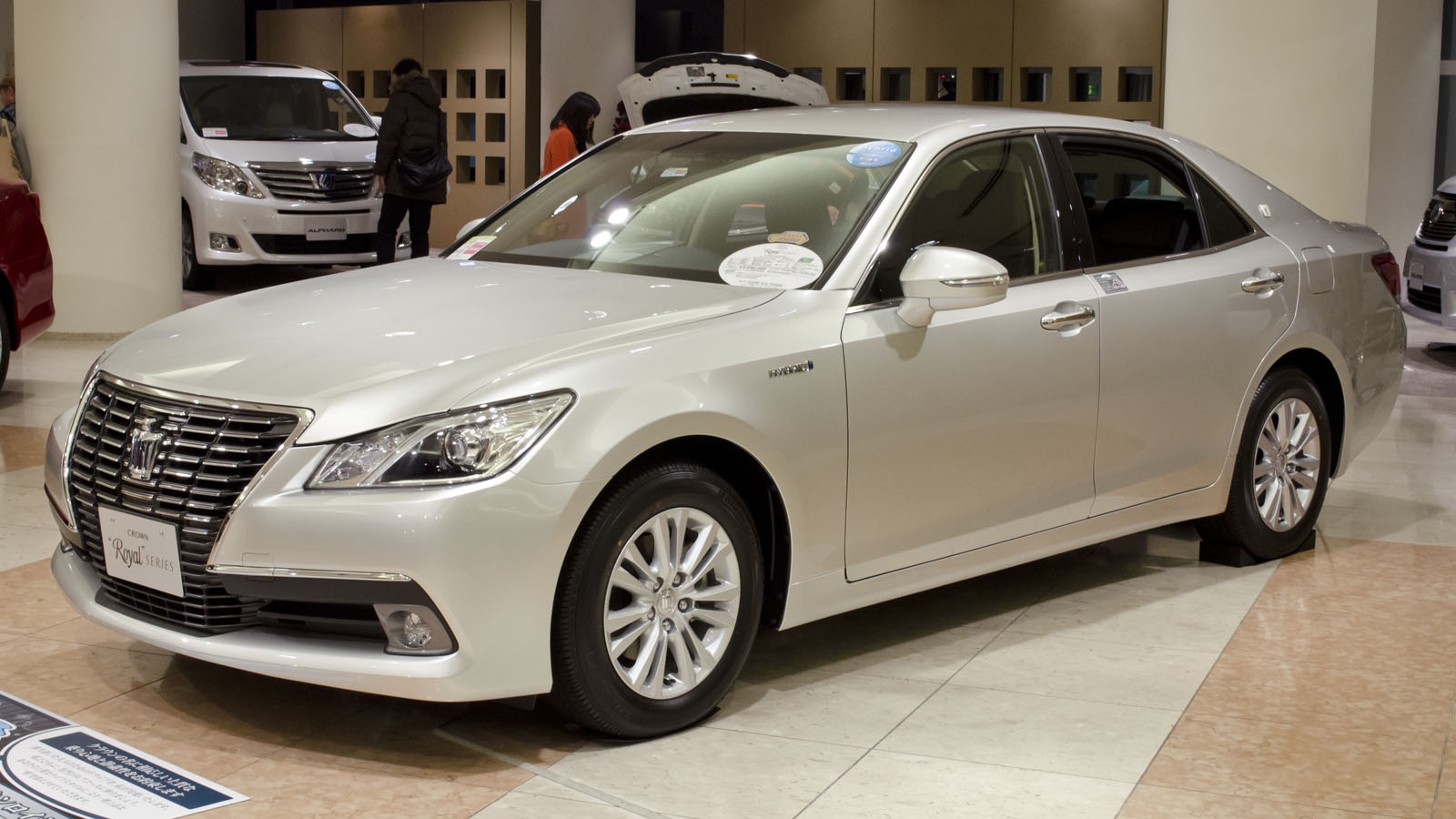
- Toyota Crown Hybrid Royal Saloon S210 (Japan; pre-facelift)

Overview
- Model code: S210
- Production: December 2012 – June 2018 (Japan); March 2015 – May 2020 (China)
- Assembly: Japan: Toyota, Aichi (Motomachi plant); China: Tianjin (TFTM)

Body and chassis
- Body style: 4-door sedan
- Layout: Front-engine, rear-wheel-drive; Front-engine, four-wheel-drive
- Platform: Toyota N platform
- Related: Toyota Crown Majesta (S210)

Powertrain
- Engine: 2.5 L 4GR-FSE V6; 2.5 L 5GR-FE V6 (China); 3.5 L 2GR-FSE V6; 2.5 L 2AR-FSE I4 (Hybrid); 2.0 L 8AR-FTS turbo I4
- Transmission: 6-speed automatic; 8-speed automatic; eCVT automatic (hybrid)

Dimensions
- Wheelbase: 2,850 mm (112.2 in); 2,925 mm (115.2 in) (China)
- Length: 4,885 mm (192.3 in); 4,970 mm (195.7 in) (China)
- Width: 1,800 mm (70.9 in); 1,805 mm (71.1 in) (China)
- Height: 1,495 mm (58.9 in); 1,480 mm (58.3 in) (China)
- Curb weight: 1,825–1,995 kg (4,023.4–4,398.2 lb); 1,660–1,690 kg (3,659.7–3,725.8 lb) (China)

Chronology
- Successor: Toyota Avalon (XX50) (China)

The fourteenth generation Crown was launched on 25 December 2012 with new styling, with the Royal series front styling theme paying homage to the fifth generation MS105 series. Most aspects of the car can be controlled by Toyota Multi-Operation Touch panel. The Crown Hybrid went on sale shortly thereafter, in January 2013. In October 2015, the Crown underwent a gentle facelift. The front grille of the Crown Athlete series adopted a three-dimensional mesh shape, with the grille frame extended to the bottom edge of the front bumper – emphasizing the low center of gravity. The front bumpers received a three-dimensional shape which extended toward the rear. The headlights were changed to Bi-Beam LED headlights that use a single light source for both high and low beam; daytime running lights were added. The rear lamps were made into a large ring shape rather than the original ribbon design. The Crown Royal series also received changes to the front, with a thicker, more sculpted front bumper and a deeper grille, extending to the front spoiler.

A special edition version of the S210 Crown, the Reborn Pink, was produced in association with Japanese presenter/producer Terry Ito. It featured a bright pink exterior and various pink interior details. It was offered to customers for the month of September 2013. Toyota stated that they received 650 orders for the car, of which were mostly from male customers. Prices for used examples remain high because of the uniqueness and rarity of the trim.

In Japan, the S210 series Crown was discontinued in June 2018, where it was replaced by the S220 model. It also ended production in May 2020 for the Chinese market, where the XX50 series Avalon replaced it.

=== China ===
The S210 Crown was launched in China in March 2015. Four trim levels were offered: Pioneer, Fashion, Sports and Elite. The Crown used the 2-liter 8AR-FTS turbocharged four-cylinder engine paired to an 8-speed automatic gearbox. Compared to its Japanese counterpart, the Crown S210 in China is 35 millimetres longer in length, 5 millimetres wider, 15 millimetres shorter in height, 65 millimetres longer in wheelbase and is 165 to 305 kilograms lighter in kerb weight. The front end of the Chinese variant has a razor blade grille just like its Japanese counterpart and has thinner headlights and tail lights for a sleeker design.

=== Gallery ===
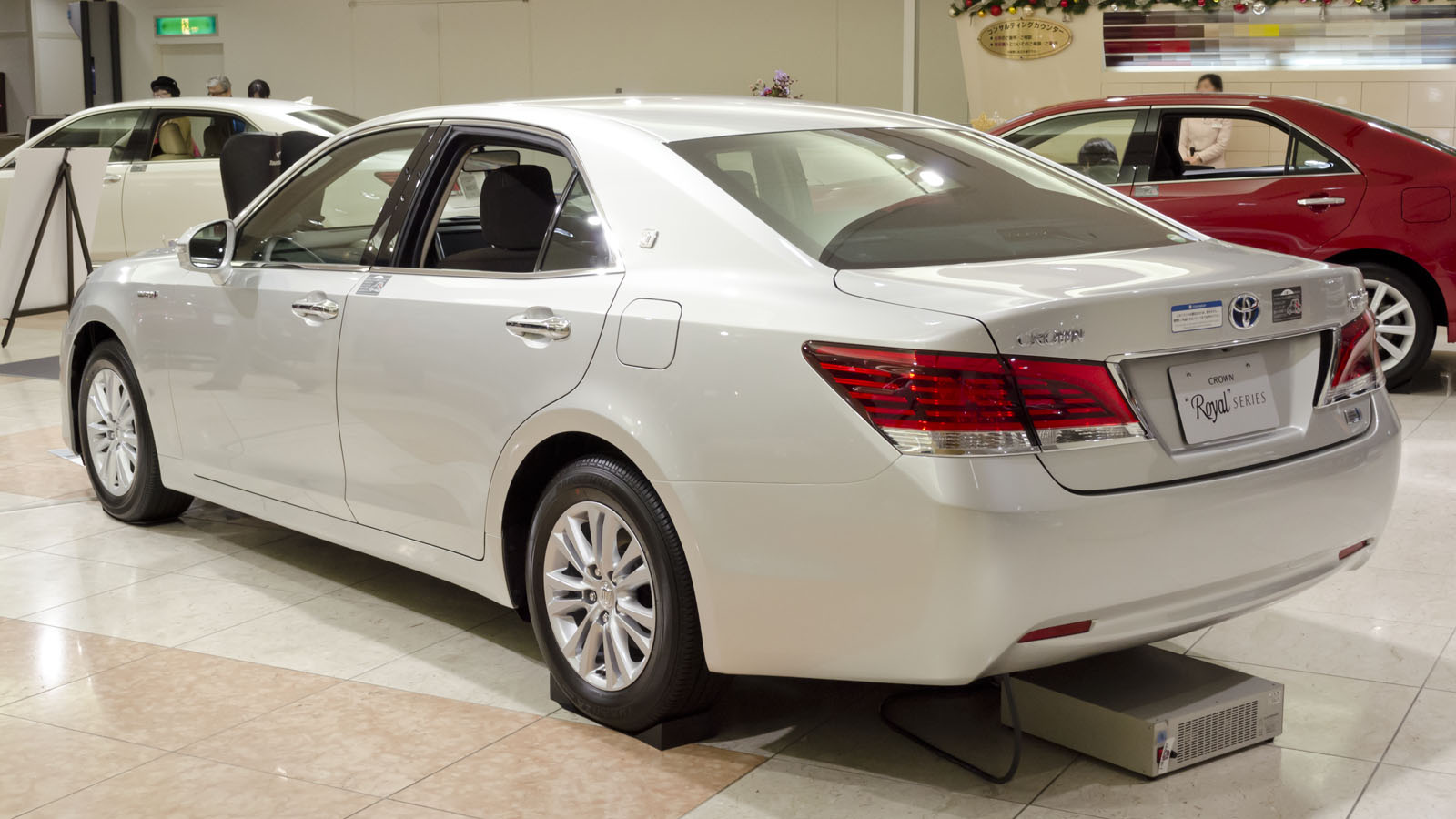
Crown Hybrid Royal Saloon (Japan; pre-facelift)

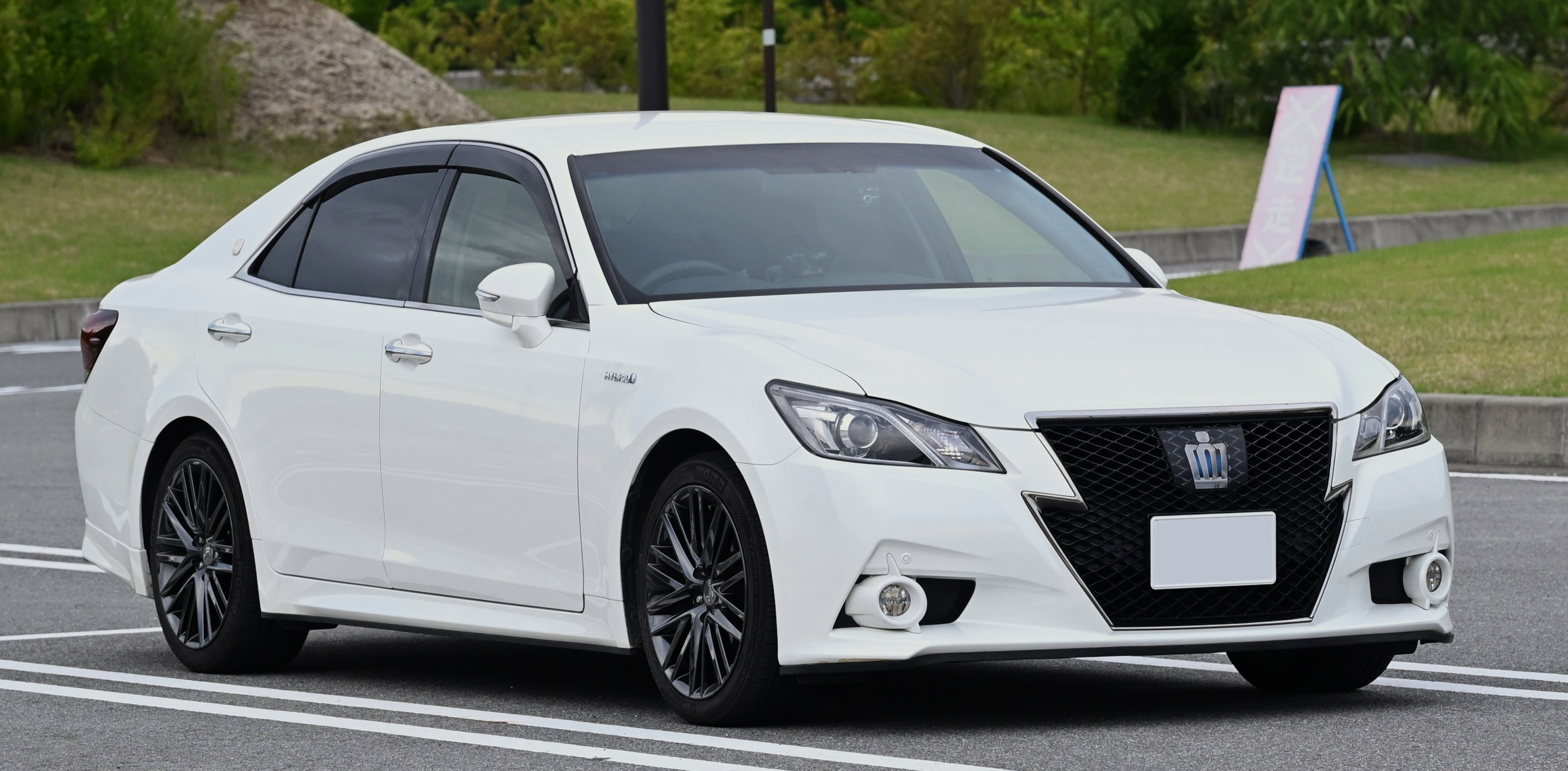
Crown Hybrid Athlete S (Japan; pre-facelift)

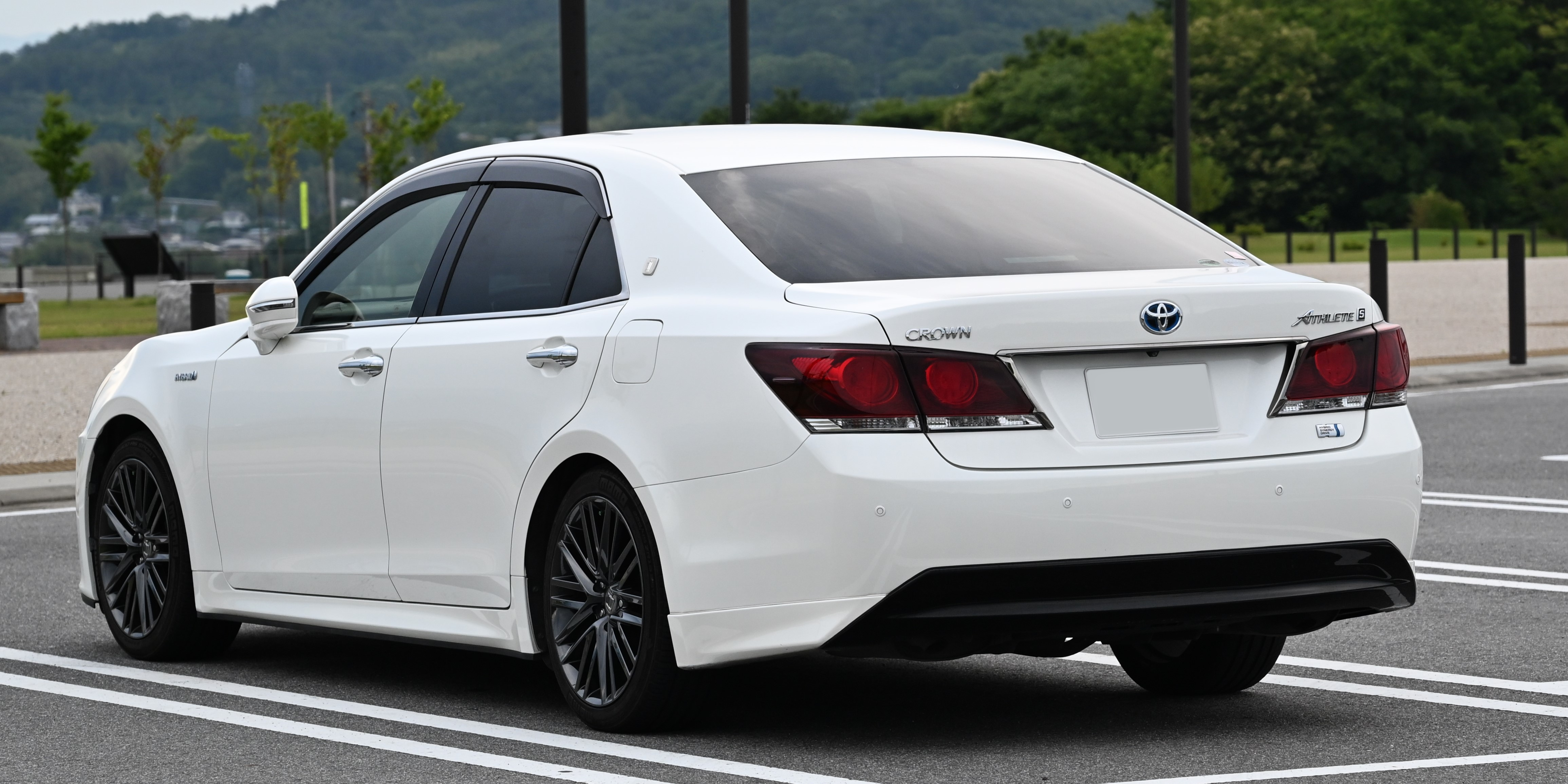
Crown Hybrid Athlete S (Japan; pre-facelift)

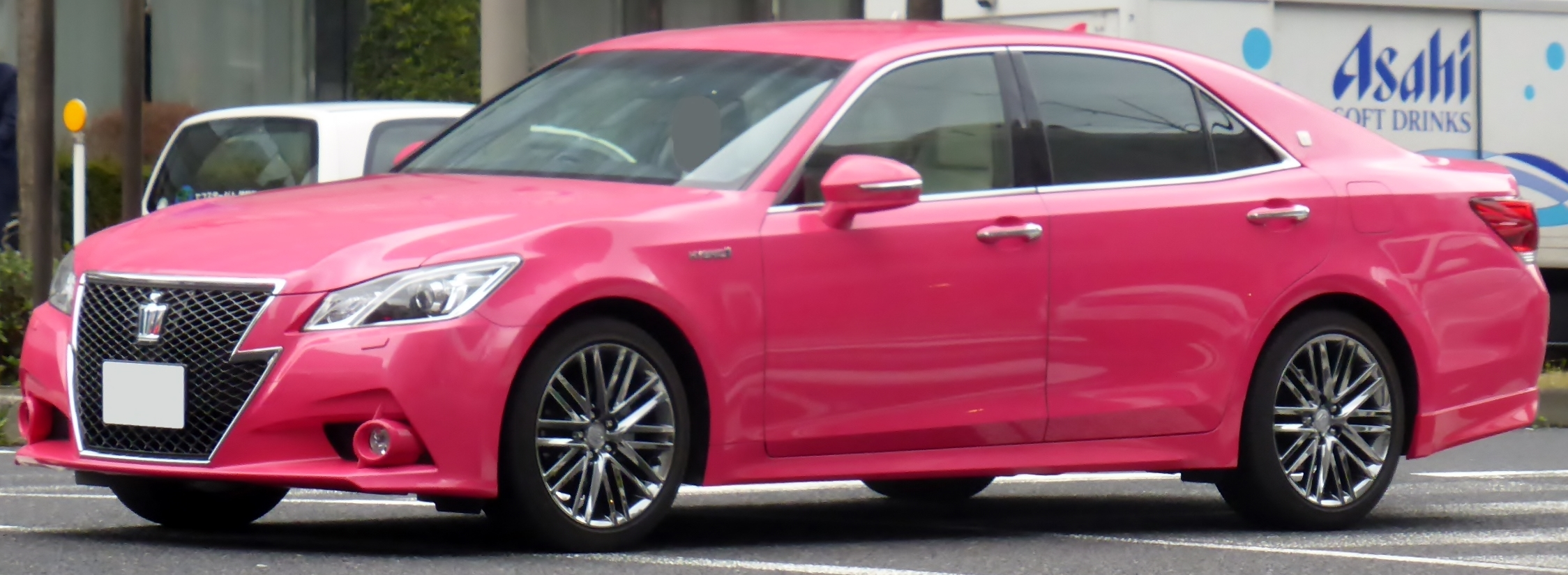
Crown Hybrid Athlete Reborn Pink (Japan)

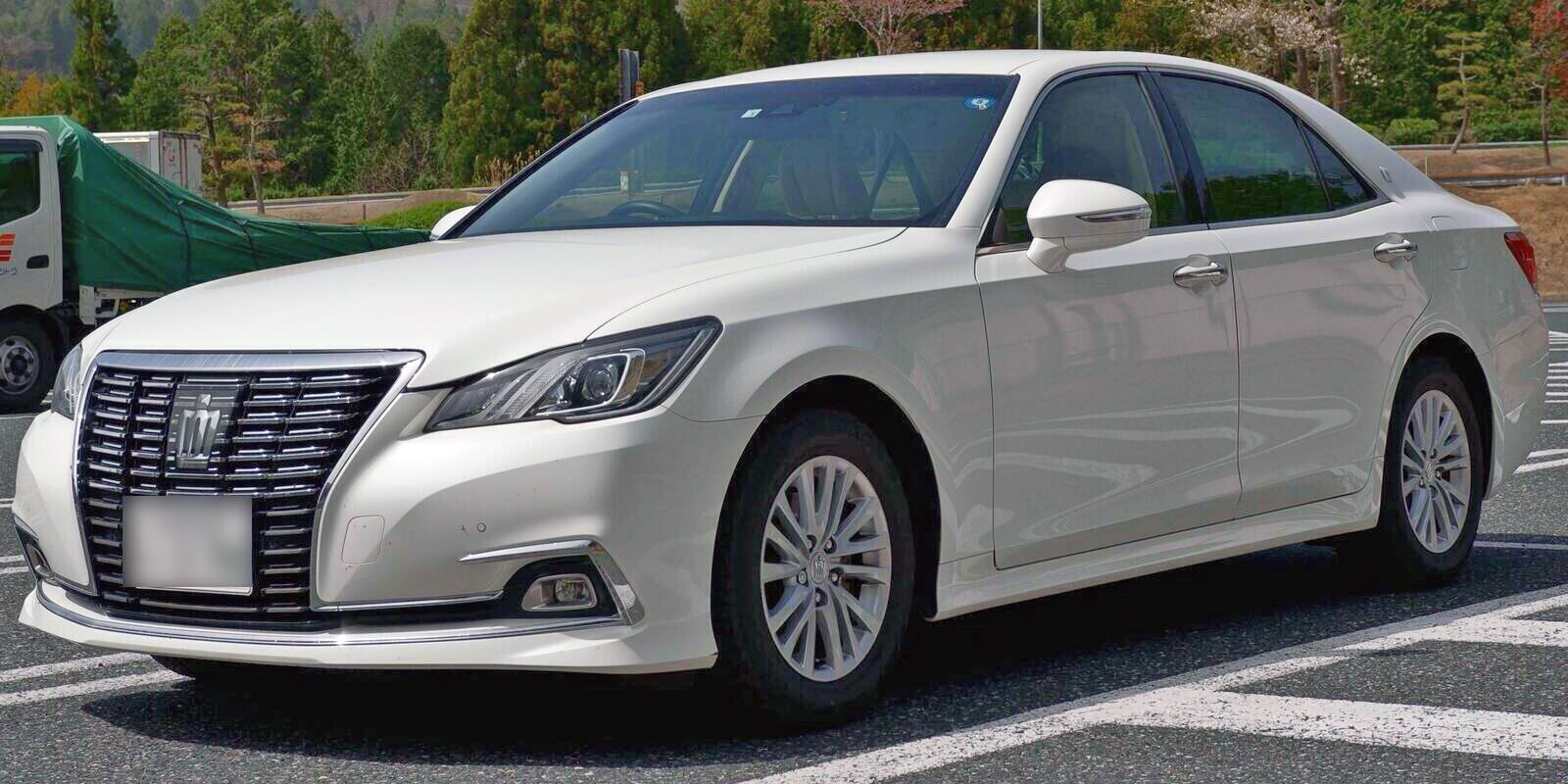
Crown Royal Saloon (Japan; facelift)

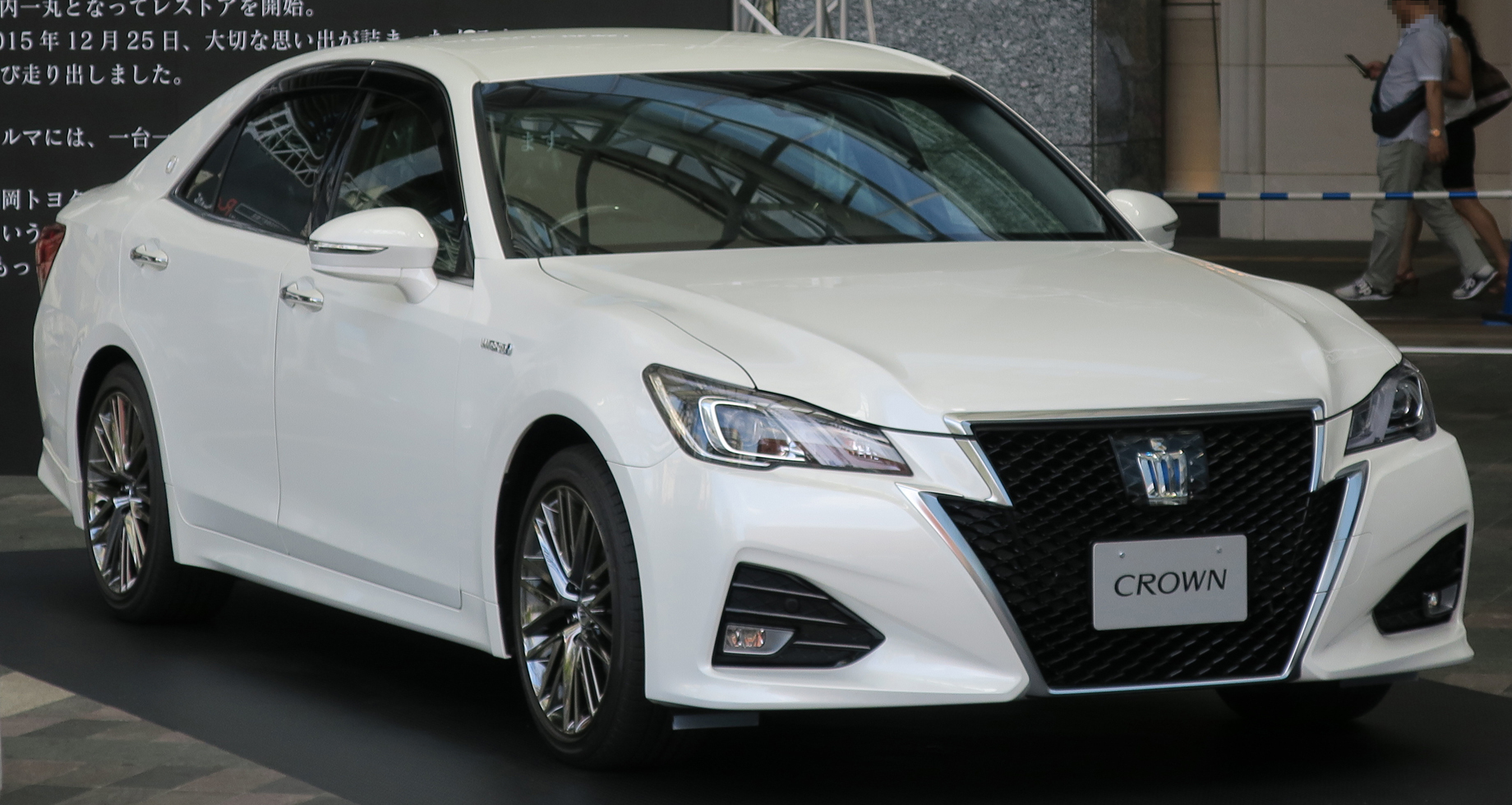
Crown Hybrid Athlete (Japan; facelift)

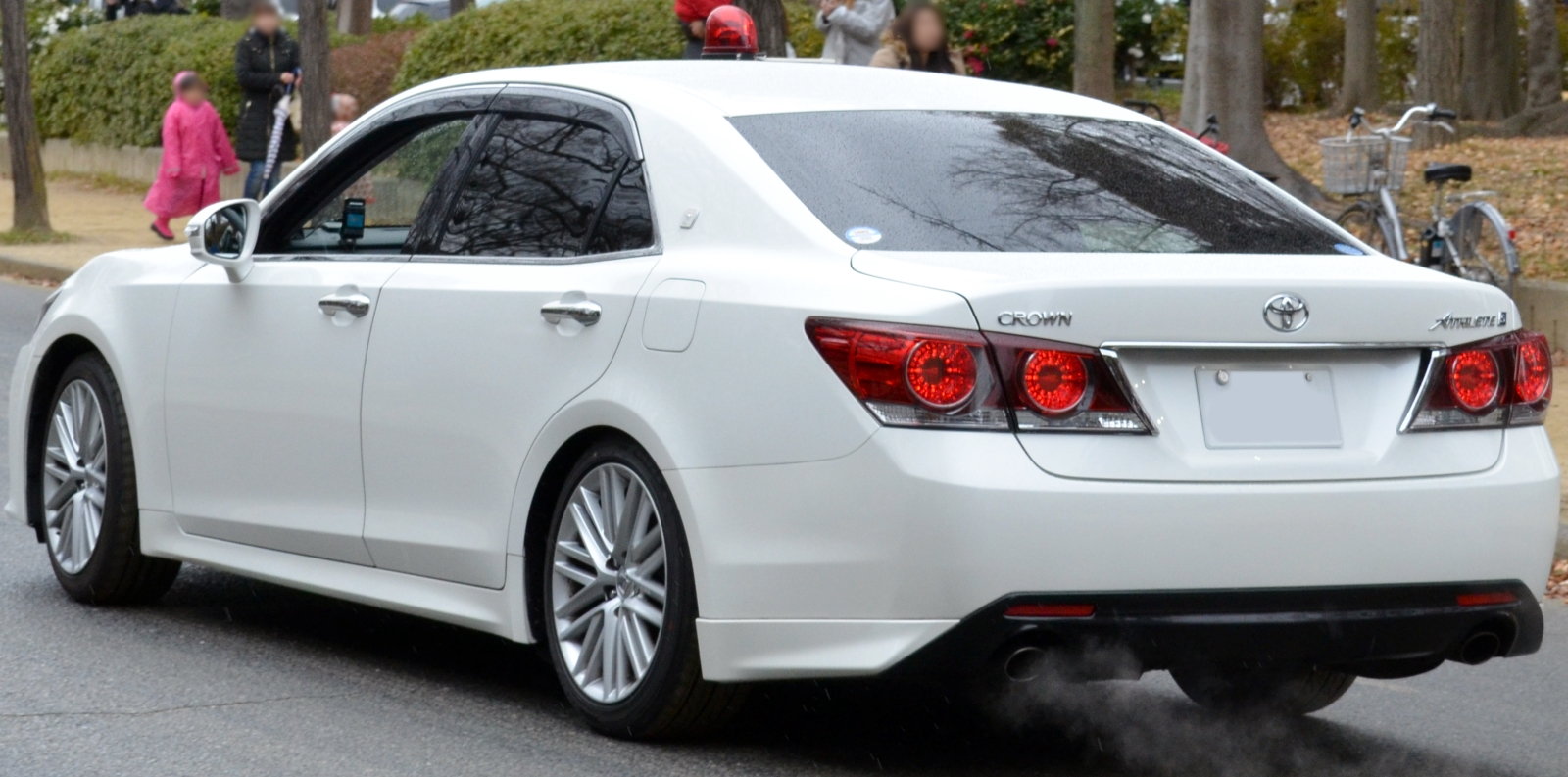
Crown Athlete (Japan; facelift)

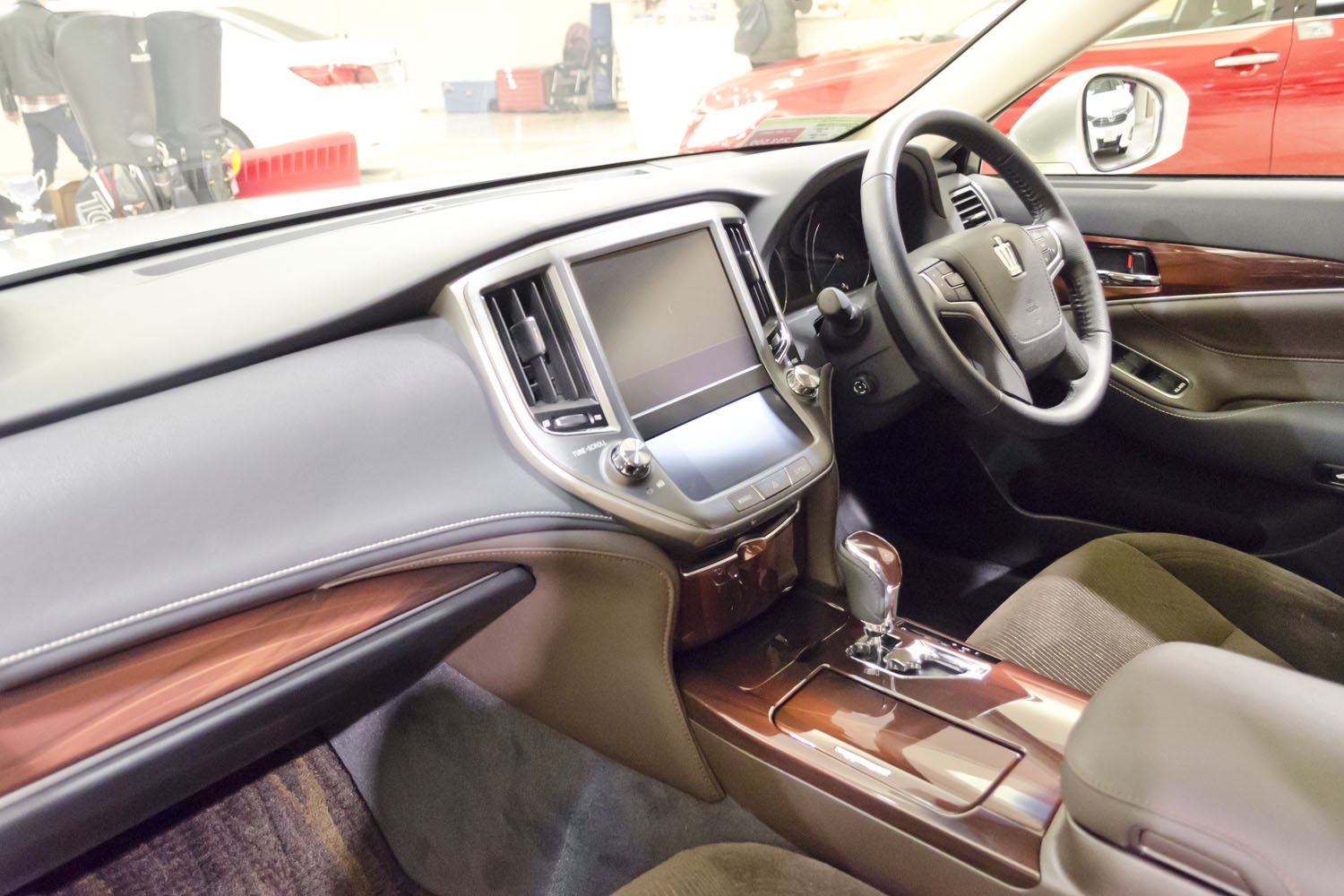
Interior

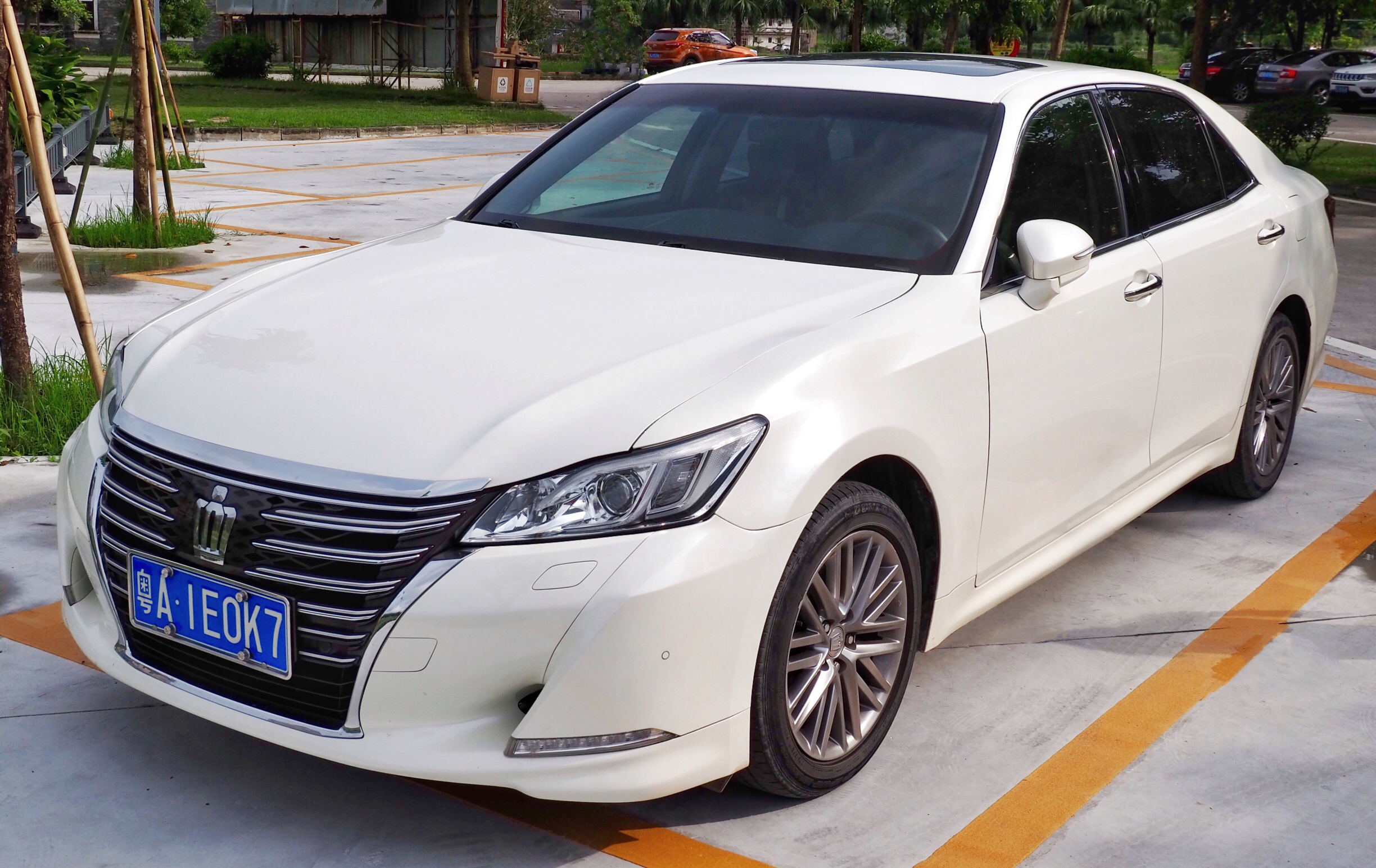
Crown front (China)

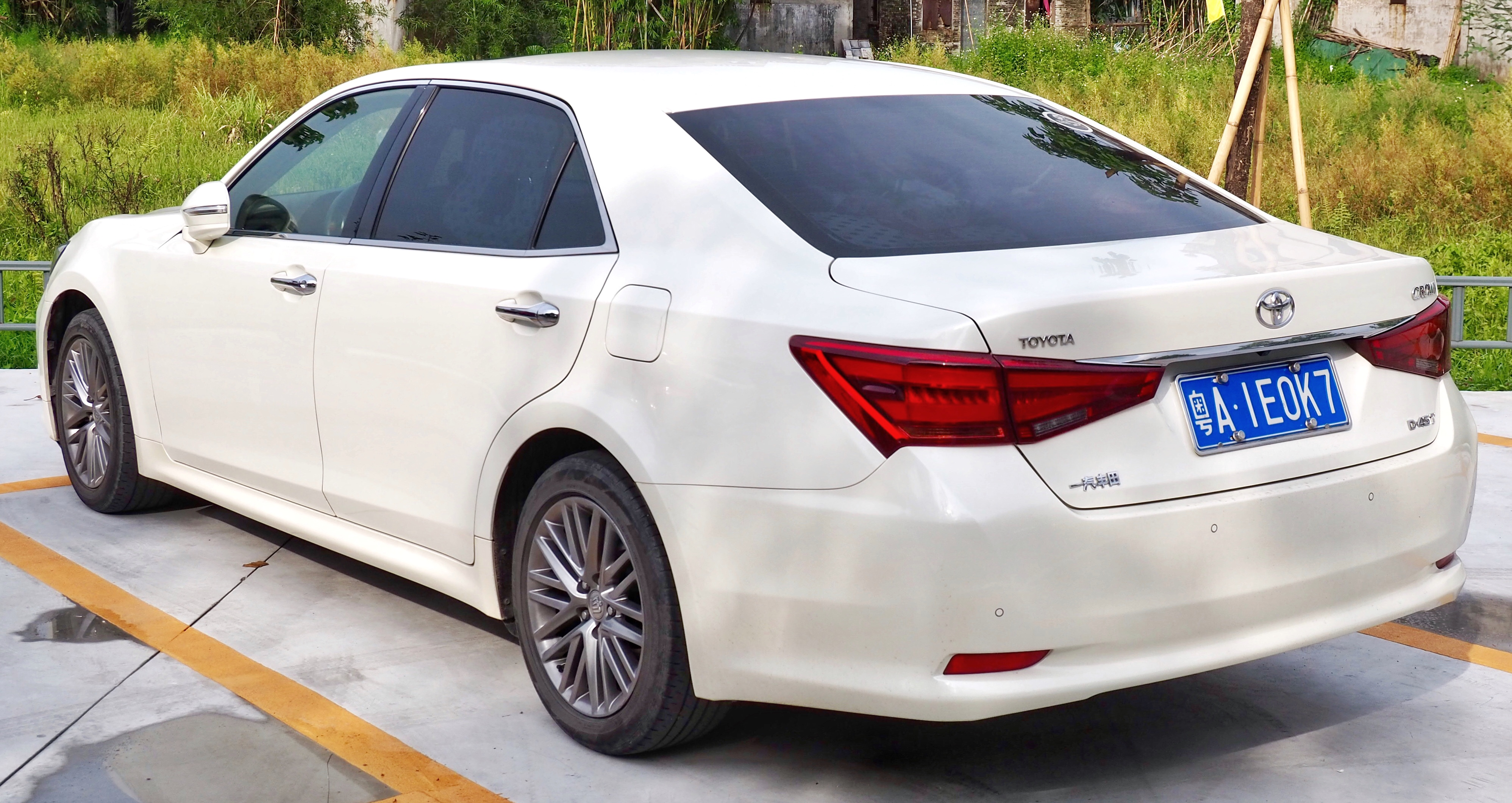
Crown rear (China)

== Fifteenth generation (S220; 2018) ==
Fifteenth generation
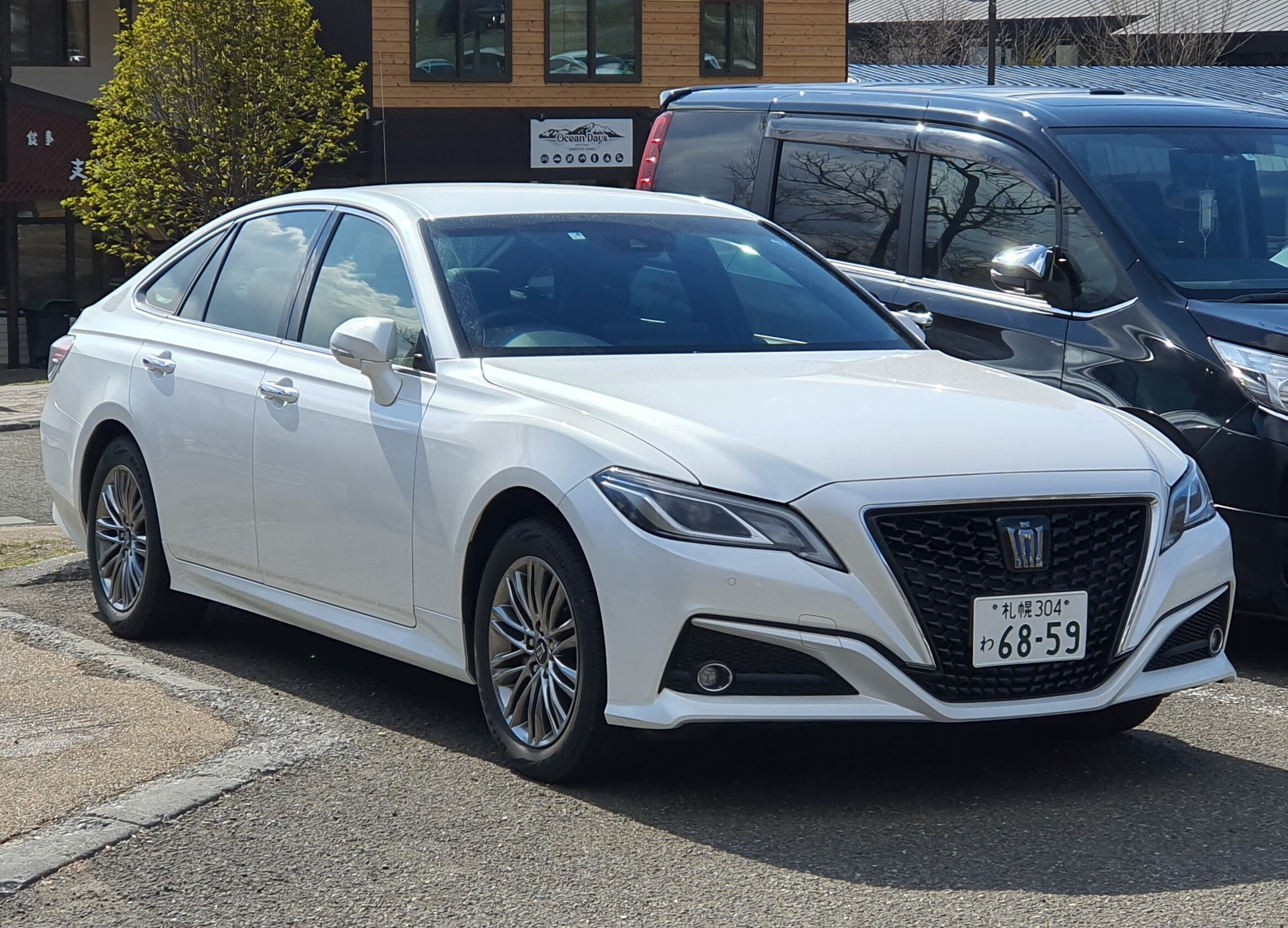
- Toyota Crown Hybrid S Four (AZSH21, Japan)

Overview
- Model code: S220
- Production: June 2018 – June 2022
- Assembly: Japan: Toyota, Aichi (Motomachi plant)

Body and chassis
- Body style: 4-door sedan
- Layout: Front-engine, rear-wheel-drive; Front-engine, four-wheel-drive (2.5 L hybrid)
- Platform: TNGA: GA-N

Powertrain
- Engine: Gasoline: 2.0 L 8AR-FTS turbo I4; Gasoline hybrid: 2.5 L A25A-FXS I4; 3.5 L 8GR-FXS V6
- Electric motor: 105 kW (143 PS; 141 hp) 1KM AC synchronous (2.5 L hybrid); 132 kW (179 PS; 177 hp) 2NM AC synchronous (3.5 L hybrid)
- Power output: List: 180 kW (245 PS; 241 hp) (2.0 L); 135 kW (184 PS; 181 hp) (2.5 L hybrid; gasoline engine only); 166 kW (226 PS; 223 hp) (2.5 L hybrid; combined system output); 220 kW (299 PS; 295 hp) (3.5 L hybrid; gasoline engine only); 264 kW (359 PS; 354 hp) (3.5 L hybrid; combined system output)
- Transmission: 8-speed automatic (2.0 L); eCVT automatic (2.5 L hybrid); 10-speed "Multi Stage Hybrid System" automatic (3.5 L hybrid)
- Hybrid drivetrain: Power-split (2.5 L hybrid)

Dimensions
- Wheelbase: 2,920 mm (115.0 in)
- Length: 4,910 mm (193.3 in)
- Width: 1,800 mm (70.9 in)
- Height: 1,455 mm (57.3 in)
- Curb weight: 1,690–1,900 kg (3,726–4,189 lb)

Chronology
- Predecessor: Toyota Crown Majesta (S210) (Crown G-Executive)

The fifteenth-generation Crown was unveiled as a concept at the 45th Tokyo Motor Show in October 2017 and went on sale on 26 June 2018. The vehicle is built on a narrow version of the same TNGA-L platform that is used by other Lexus and luxury Toyota sedans. Three engine choices are offered, along with numerous trim packages.

Trim levels for the Japanese market Crown are B, S, G, G Executive, RS-B, RS, and RS Advance. All trim levels are offered with either rear wheel drive or full-time all-wheel drive. The S220 Crown carried over the 2.0-liter 8AR-FTS turbocharged four-cylinder gasoline engine from the previous model, introduced the 2.5 liter A25A-FXS paired with the Hybrid Synergy Drive system, as well as the 3.5-liter 8GR-FXS V6 paired with the Multi Stage Hybrid system from the Lexus LC 500h and LS 500h. The 2.0 L turbocharged engine is only available in the rear wheel drive RS and RS Advance. All trim levels, except the rear wheel drive G Executive, can be purchased with the 2.5 L Hybrid. The 3.5 L Hybrid is only installed in the rear wheel drive RS Advance and G Executive. The only engine for the 4WD models is 2.5 L Hybrid. The 2.5 L Hybrid G Executive is the only version exported to Indonesia.

In October 2019, the S220 Crown was selected by the government of Indonesia to serve as an official vehicle for cabinet ministers, replacing the older Crown Royal Saloon which had been in use since 2009. However, unlike some preceding generations of the Crown in Indonesia, the S220 is only imported in small numbers and is not available for consumer purchase.

In 2020, a facelift of the S220 Crown was planned but rejected by president Akio Toyoda and scrapped in favour of developing a new generation. However, in November 2020, the S220 received a minor update which brought a redesigned centre control stack and centre console to the interior, featuring a single 12.3-inch touchscreen and more intuitive physical climate controls in place of the previous dual-screen design. Other minor trim changes were also made, for instance, the Crown RS now had chromed side window frames rather than the blacked out frames used earlier.

=== T-Connect ===
The fifteenth-generation Crown is one of the first Toyota models to be equipped with a DCM (Data Communication Module) system which then links with a Vehicle Control Network. By using this hardware, Toyota was able to provide various connected services to T-Connect (Note: Languages available for T Connect as of now are only Japanese.) subscribers through its proprietary Mobility Service Platform (MSPF), an information infrastructure developed by the company for Connected Cars. From then, Toyota intended to equip most new passenger vehicles in its domestic market with DCM.

On August 1, 2018, Toyota Motor Corporation (Toyota), with Toyota City, started Japan's first verification testing for road maintenance inspections using vehicle data obtained from connected cars. The verification test enabled assessment of whether the degree of road deterioration index values computed from the car's behavior data and actual road conditions are consistent, and validate these findings on more typical regional roads. Toyota also aimed to further advance its technology toward supporting administrative services that implement road maintenance and inspection work in Toyota City more accurately and appropriately.

==== Toyota Safety Sense 2.0 ====
The fifteenth generation Crown is equipped with Toyota Safety Sense 2.0 just like most Toyota models for 2018. Some added or improved features include:

- (LTA) Lane Tracing Assist
- Dynamic Radar Cruise Control (with all-speed vehicle following function)
- (PCS) Pre-Collision System with Pedestrian Detection (can detect bicyclists and even pedestrians at night)
- (AHB) Automatic High Beam
- (RSA) Road Sign Assist
- Advance car launch notification function

=== Gallery ===
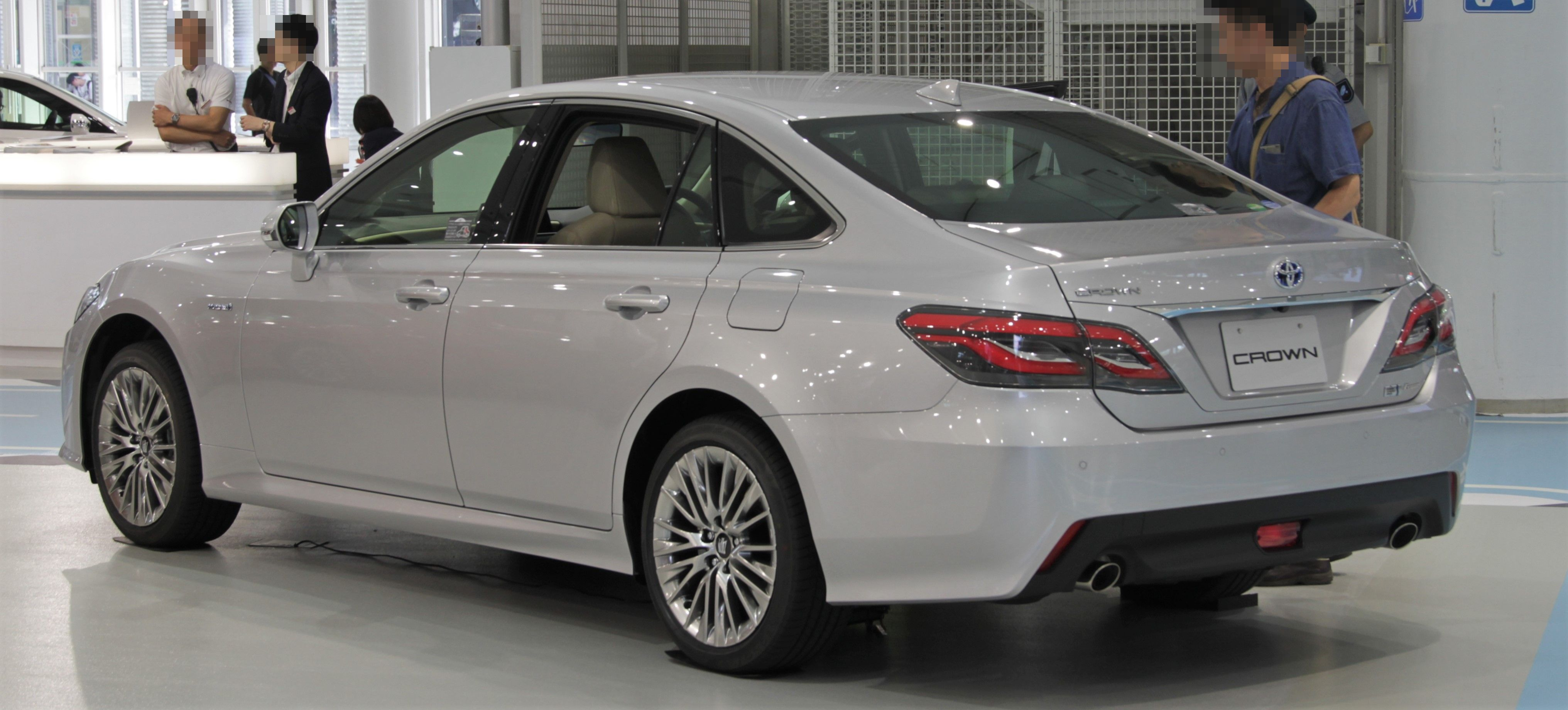
2018 Toyota Crown 2.5 Hybrid S Four (AZSH21, Japan)

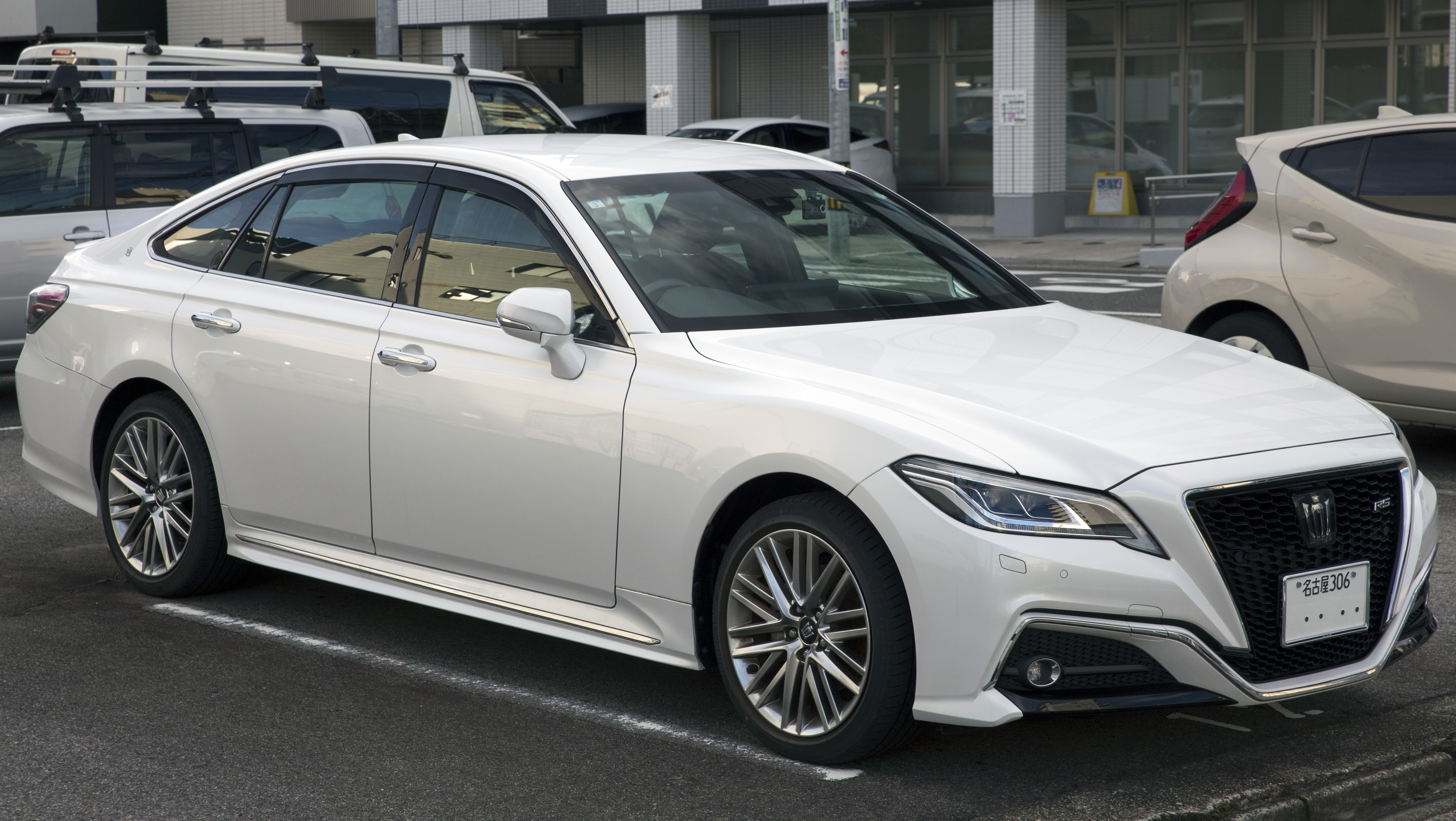
2021 Toyota Crown 2.0 RS (ARS220, Japan)

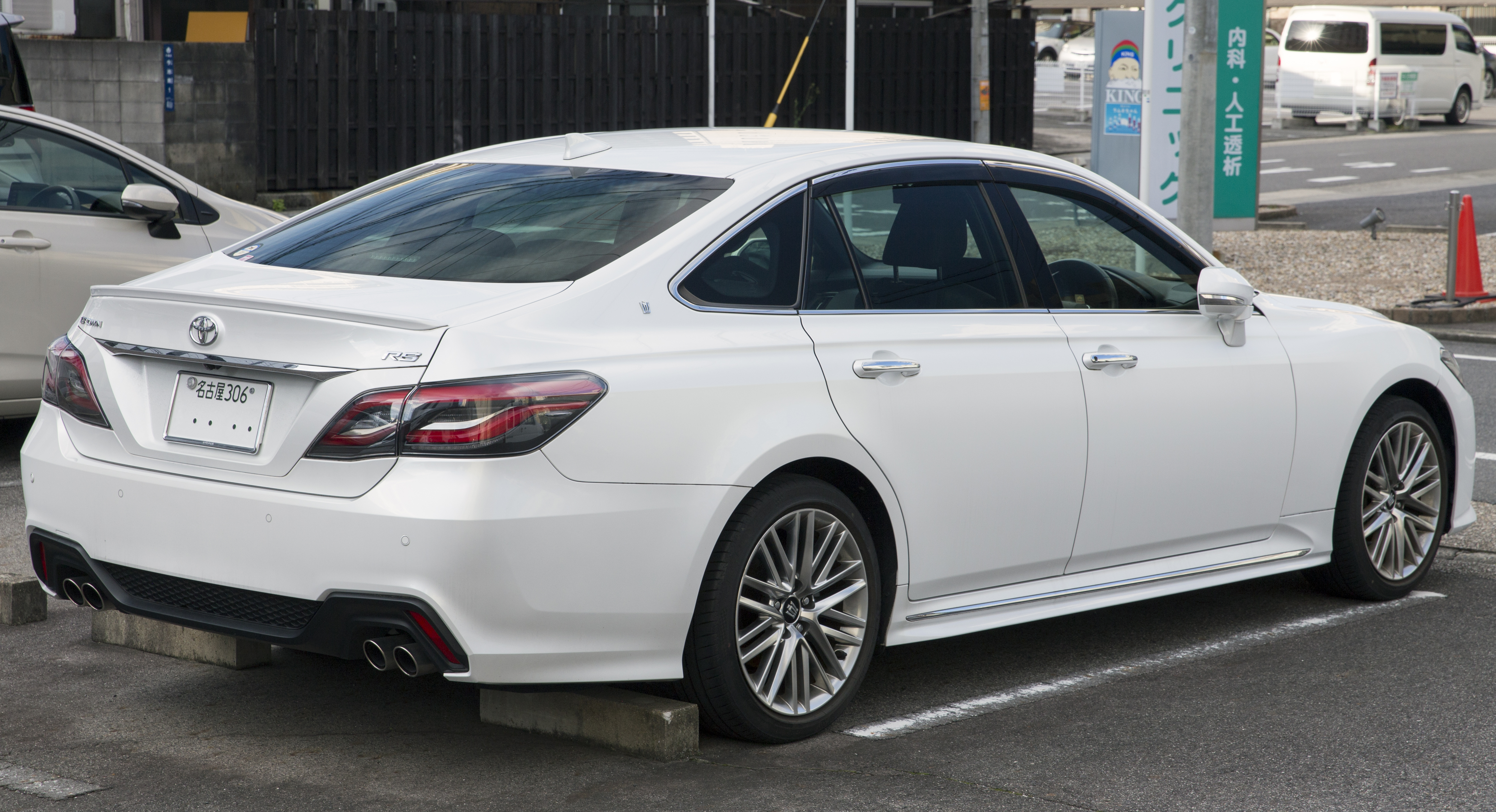
Rear view (RS)

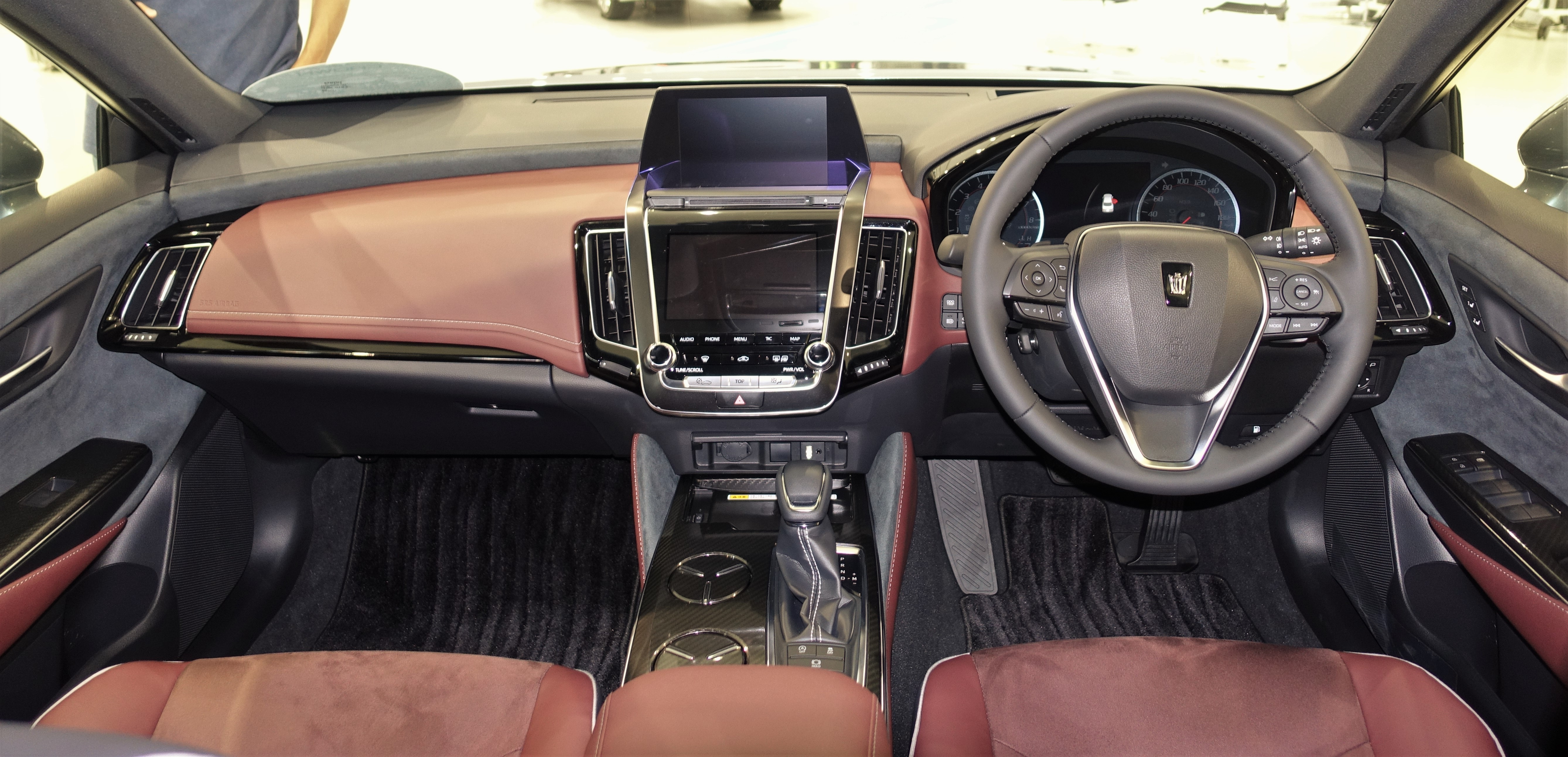
Interior (2018–2020)

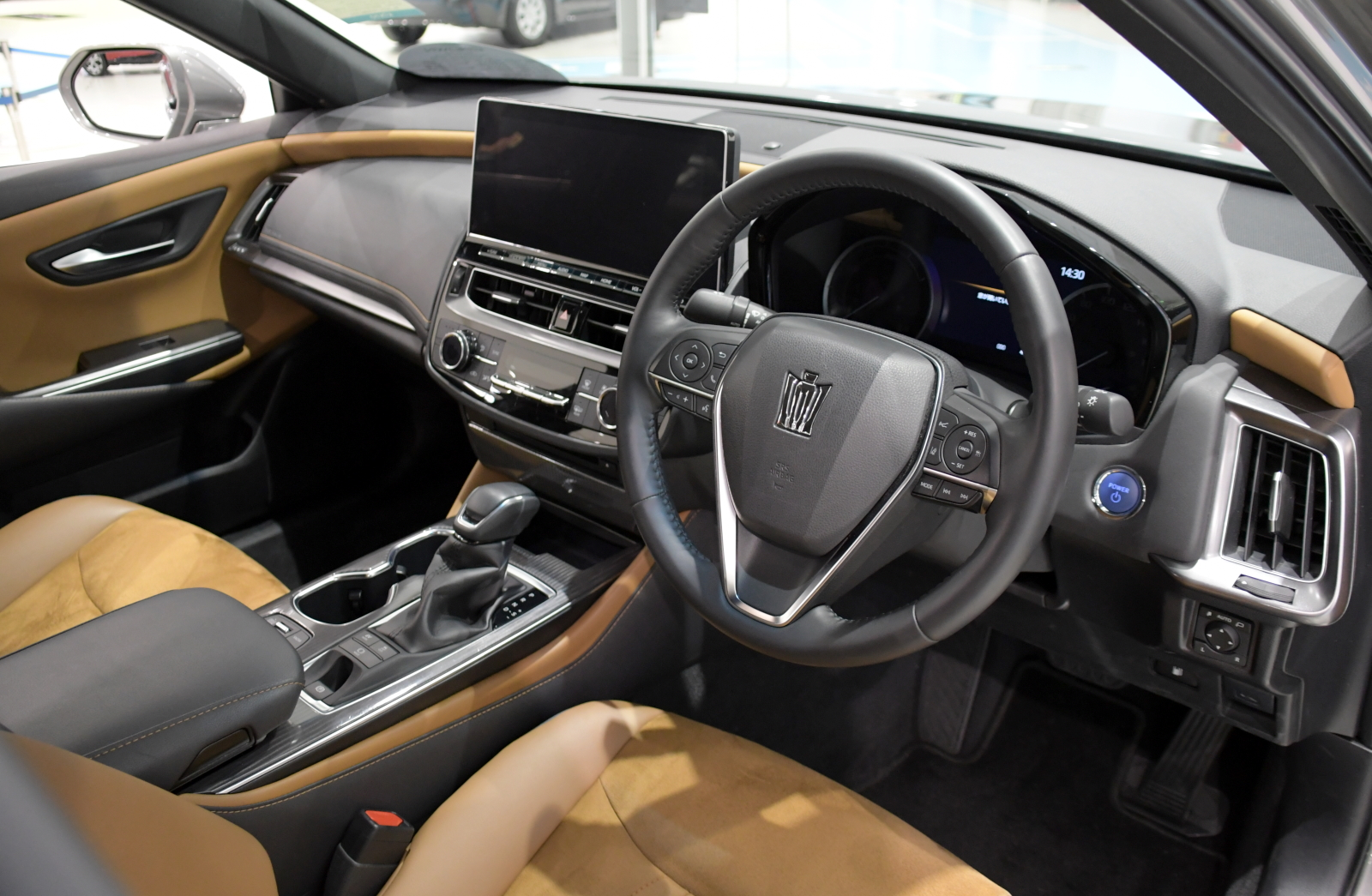
Interior (2020–2022)

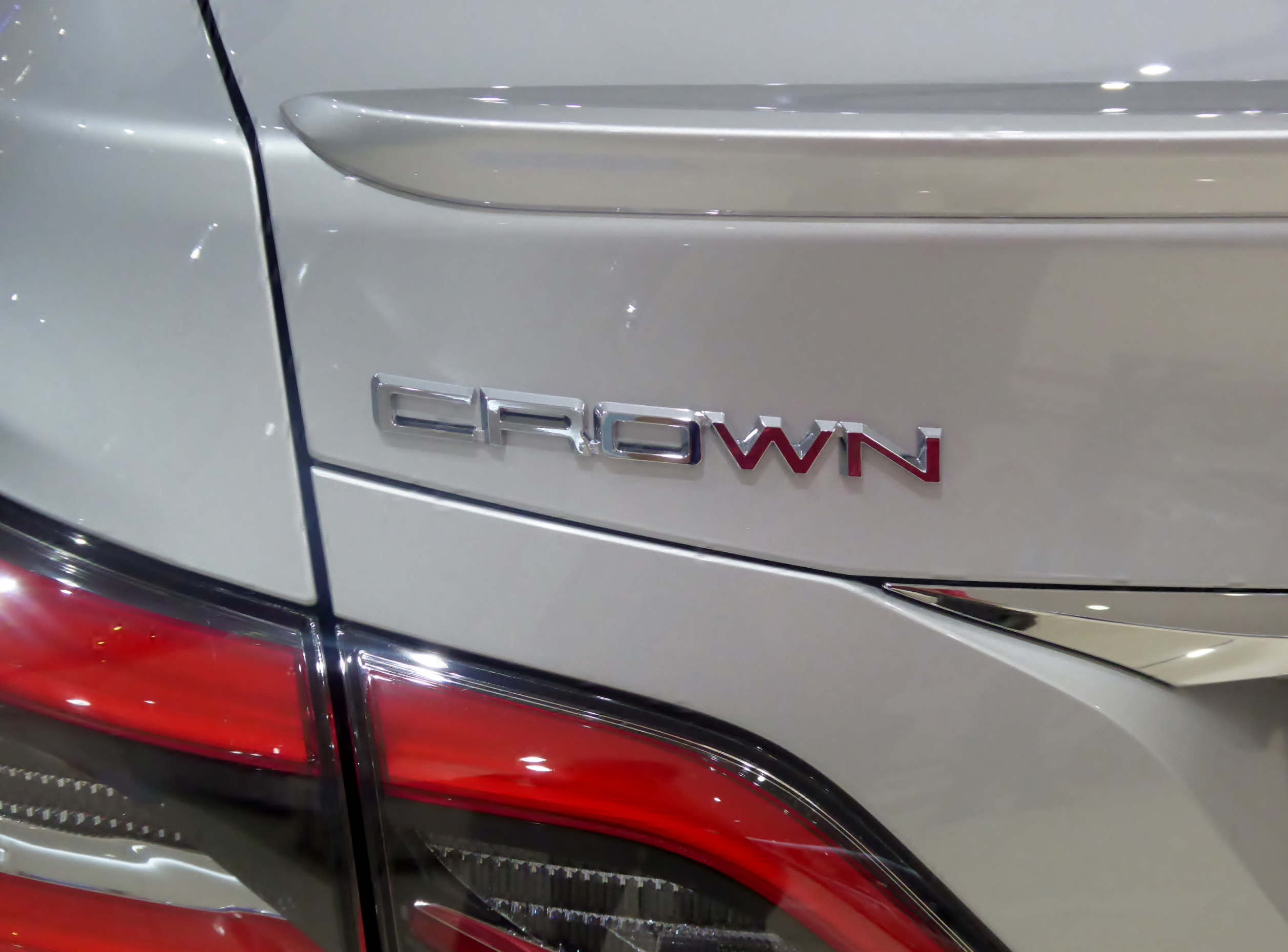
The Crown emblem for the fifteenth generation model

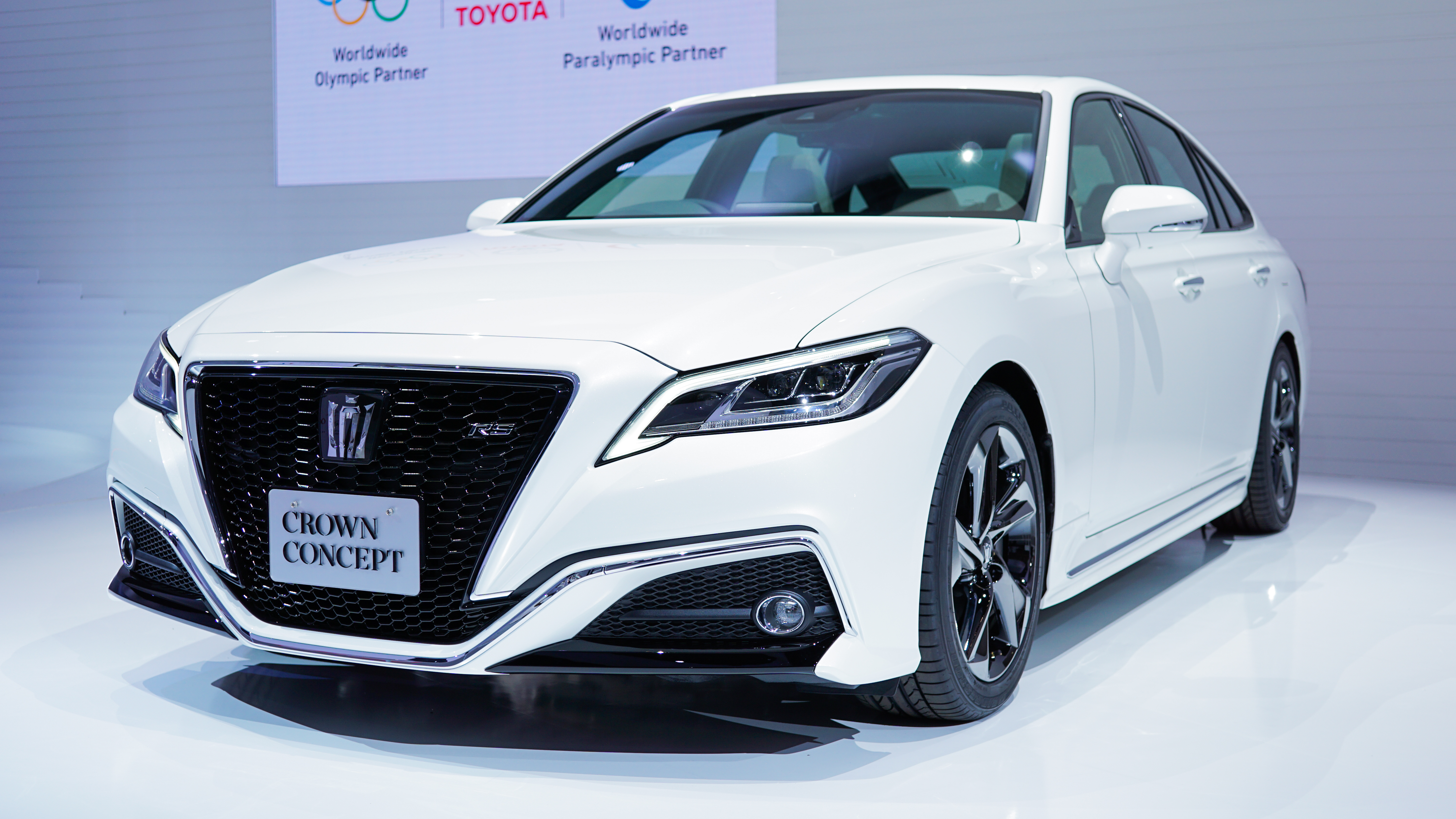
Toyota Crown prototype displayed at the 2017 Tokyo Motor Show

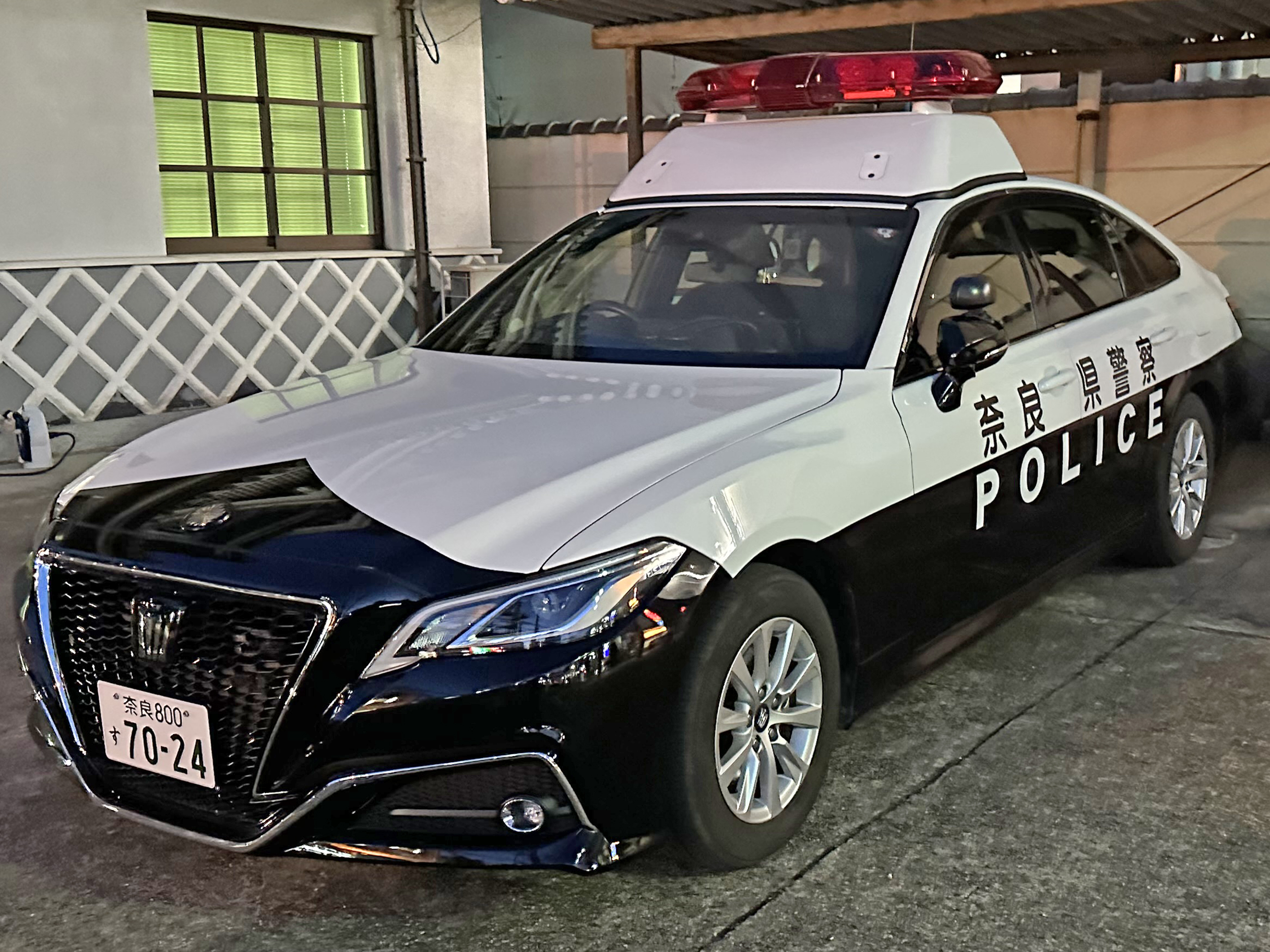
Toyota Crown 2.0 Turbo S (ARS220) used as police car of Nara Prefecture

== Sixteenth generation (S230; 2022) ==
The sixteenth generation of the Crown family was unveiled on 15 July 2022. Considered as a "reboot" to the Crown nameplate, four body styles were introduced, which are Crossover, Sport (previewed by the Crossover EV concept car in December 2021), Sedan and Estate. The latter three body styles were released within the 2023 and 2024 timeframe. Citing the Crown as a "symbol of Japan's affluence and Japanese pride", Toyota CEO Akio Toyoda announced that the Crown range of vehicles would be available in global markets for the first time in history, with availability in about 40 countries and regions with an expected annual sales volume of around 200,000 units. In Japan, the four models were sold in dedicated stores for the Crown brand, named "The Crown".

The decision to develop the sixteenth-generation Crown arose from rejection of plans for a mid-generational refresh of the fifteenth-generation model, after Akio Toyoda scrapped the plans and advocated for a next-generation model at a product planning meeting.

With the exception of the S230/232 sedan, this generation is the first Crown to use a front-wheel drive-based platform (TNGA-K) – although it is paired with Toyota's drive shaft-less electric all-wheel drive (E-Four) system as standard.

In Japan the Crown Crossover, Sport and Sedan were updated in September 2026.

=== Crossover (S235; 2022) ===
Sixteenth generation Crossover
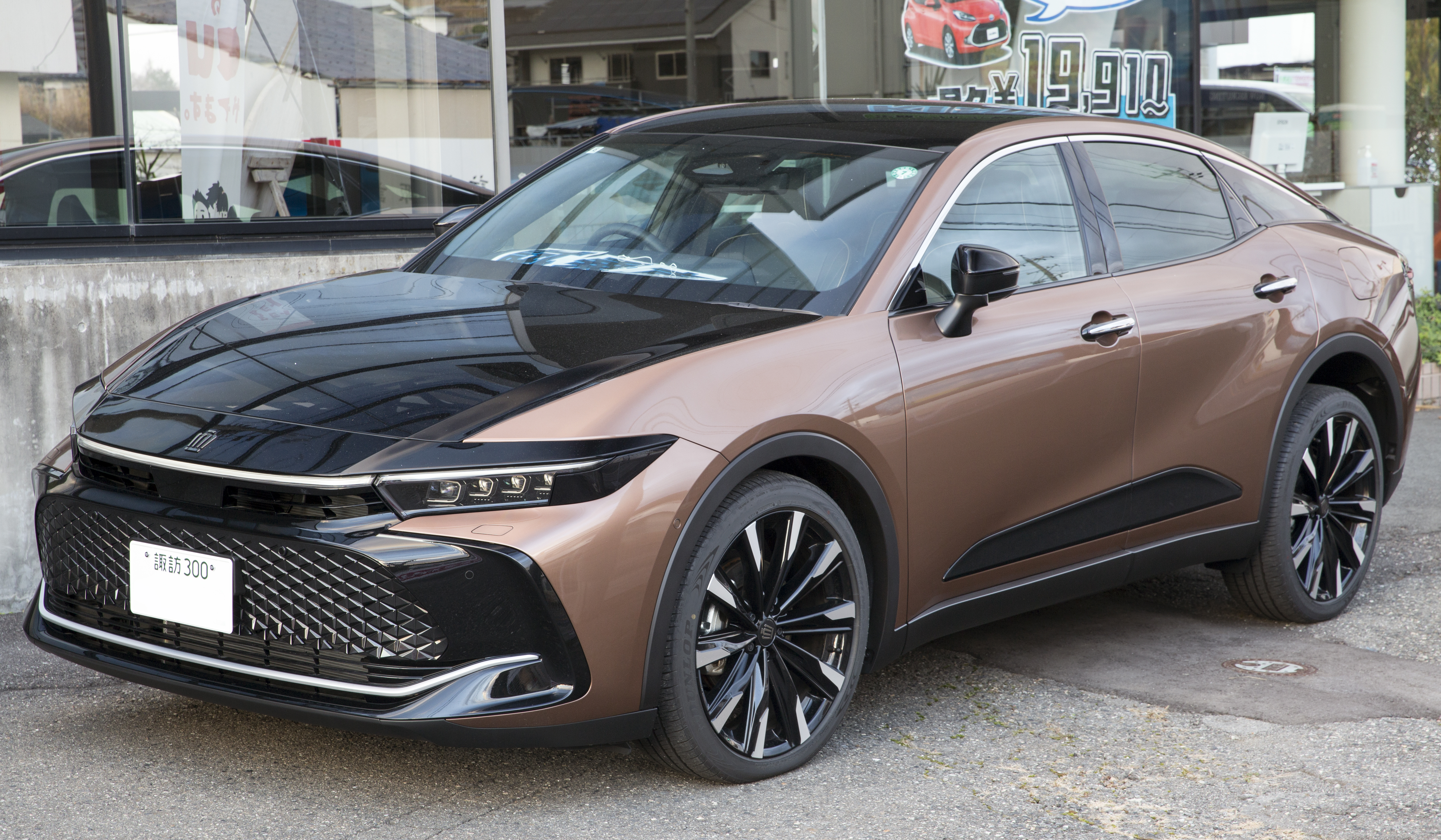
- 2024 Toyota Crown Crossover RS (TZSH35, Japan)

Overview
- Model code: S235
- Also called: Toyota Crown SportCross (China)
- Production: July 2022 – present
- Model years: 2023–present (North America)
- Assembly: Japan: Toyota, Aichi (Motomachi plant and Tsutsumi plant)
- Designer: Mitsunori Miyazaki (project chief designer); Toyokazu Nishihama and Yukiko Yano (exterior); Shunsuke Tanaka and Koji Yamaguchi (interior)

Body and chassis
- Class: Mid-size car
- Body style: 4-door fastback sedan
- Layout: Transverse front-engine, four-wheel-drive (E-Four)
- Platform: TNGA: GA-K
- Related: Toyota Crown Sport; Toyota Crown Signia/Estate; Lexus RX (ALA10/ALH10); Toyota Highlander/Kluger/Crown Kluger (XU70); Lexus ES (XZ10)

Powertrain
- Engine: Gasoline hybrid: 2.5 L A25A-FXS I4 (AZSH35); 2.5 L A25B-FXS I4 (China, AZSH30); 2.4 L T24A-FTS turbo I4 (TZSH35)
- Electric motor: List: 2× permanent magnet synchronous: 2.5 L: 3NM (front); 4NM (rear); 2.4 L turbo: 1ZM (front); 1YM (rear)
- Power output: List: 2.5 L: 137 kW (184 hp; 186 PS) (gasoline engine only); 88 kW (118 hp; 120 PS) (3NM motor); 40 kW (54 hp; 54 PS) (4NM motor); 172 kW (231 hp; 234 PS) (combined system output); 2.4 L turbo: 200 kW (268 hp; 272 PS) (gasoline engine only); 61 kW (82 hp; 83 PS) (1ZM motor); 59 kW (79 hp; 80 PS) (1YM motor); 257 kW (345 hp; 349 PS) (combined system output)
- Transmission: eCVT (2.5 L); 6-speed "Direct Shift-6AT" automatic + "eAxle" (2.4 L turbo)
- Hybrid drivetrain: Power-split (2.5 L); Parallel (2.4 L turbo)
- Battery: 5 Ah nickel–metal hydride

Dimensions
- Wheelbase: 2,850 mm (112.2 in)
- Length: 4,930–4,980 mm (194.1–196.1 in)
- Width: 1,840 mm (72.4 in)
- Height: 1,540–1,555 mm (60.6–61.2 in)
- Curb weight: 1,720–1,980 kg (3,792–4,365 lb)

Chronology
- Predecessor: Toyota Avalon (North America and Middle East)

The Crossover-type Crown was released on 15 July 2022 as the first body style of the sixteenth-generation Crown family to be launched. It was sold in North America after 50 years of hiatus of the Crown nameplate in the region since 1972.

The design of the Crossover-type Crown was described as a combination between a full-size sedan and an SUV, with a sloping roof and a conventional sedan trunk opening. It is based on the front-wheel drive-based GA-K platform while offering "E-Four"/"E-Four Advanced" electric four-wheel drive system as standard. All models come equipped with acoustic glass and extensive sound deadening to improve noise, vibration, and harshness, emphasizing Crown's premium positioning.

Mass production of the Crown Crossover was started at the Tsutsumi plant from around late August 2022, and at the Motomachi plant from mid-September 2022.

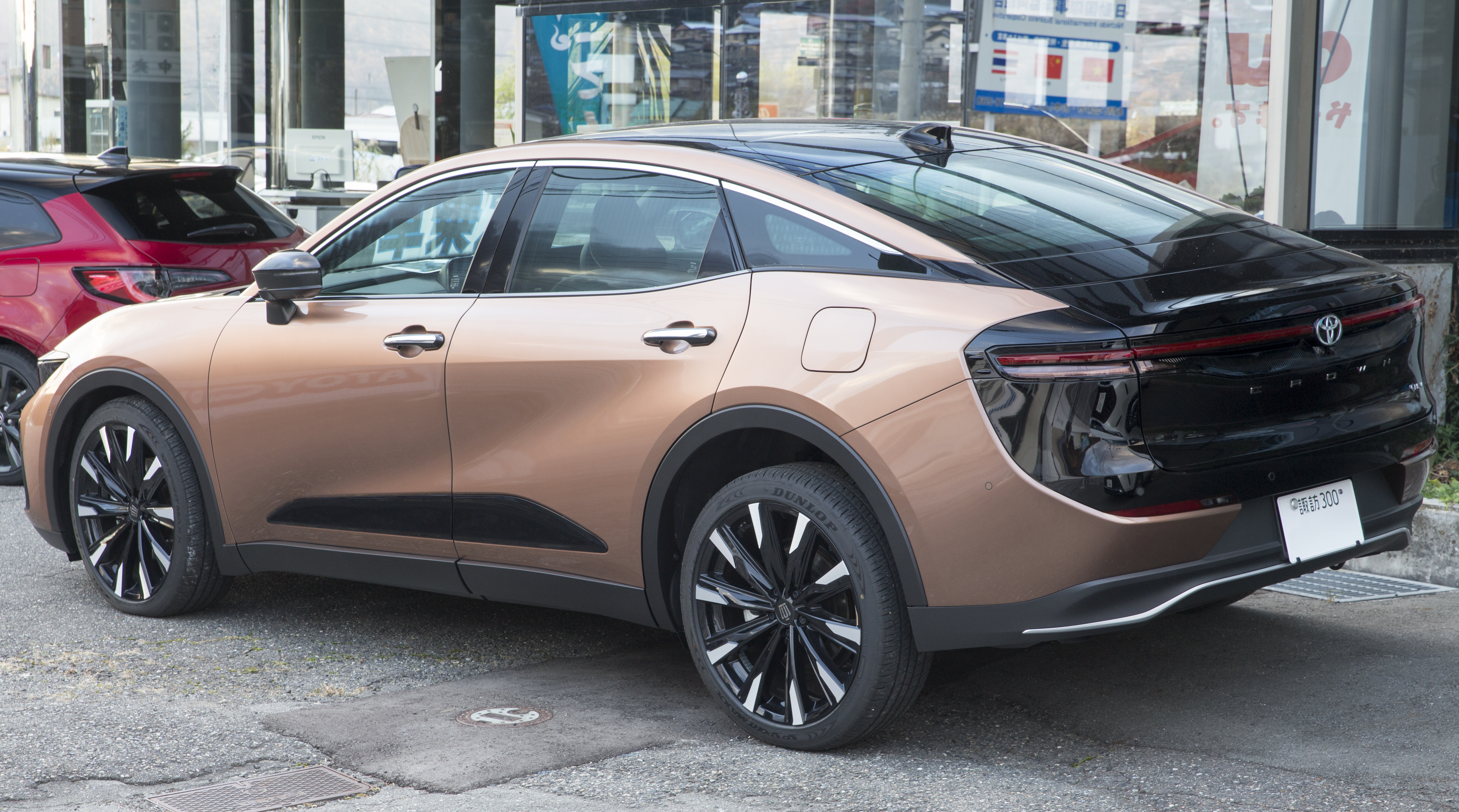
Rear view

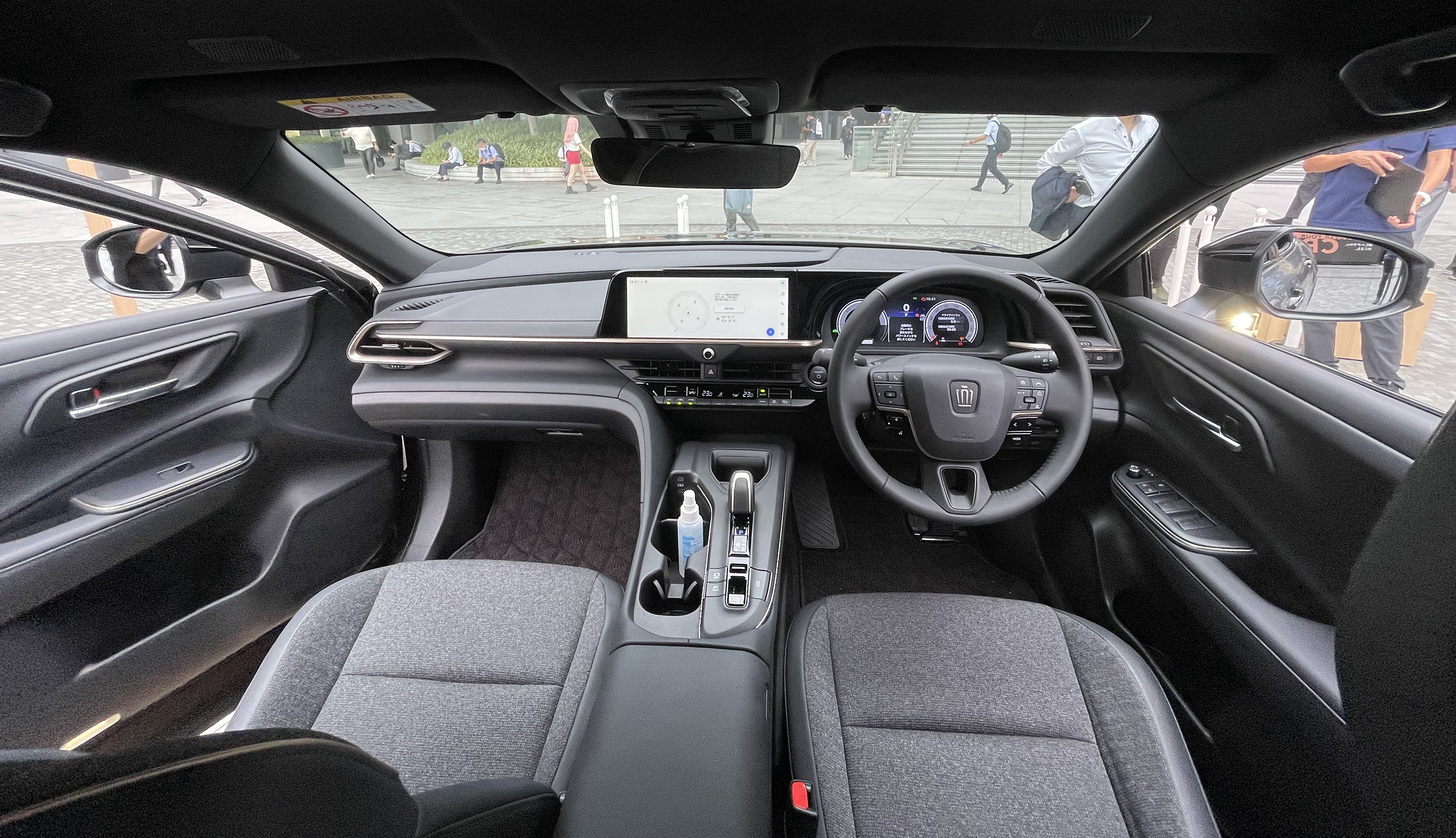
Interior

==== Powertrain ====
Two standard gasoline hybrid powertrain options are offered, which is a 2.5-liter A25A-FXS engine producing a total 172 kW (231 hp; 234 PS) of system output with "E-Four" four-wheel drive system and eCVT, and a more powerful turbocharged 2.4-liter T24A-FTS engine (marketed as "Dual Boost Hybrid System" in Japan and "Hybrid Max" in North America) producing a total 257 kW (345 hp; 349 PS) of system output and 542 N⋅m (400 lb⋅ft) of torque with "E-Four Advanced" four-wheel drive system and a 6-speed "Direct Shift-6AT" automatic transmission with rear "eAxle".

Toyota Crown hybrid drivetrains
Model Spec		Hybrid A25A-FXS		Dual Boost / Max T24A-FTS	
Model Spec		Power	Torque	Power	Torque
Output	Combined, net	166–176 kW (222–236 hp)	—	254–260 kW (340–349 hp)	543 N⋅m (400.4 lb⋅ft)
Output	Gasoline engine	137 kW (186 PS; 184 hp) @ 6000	221 N⋅m (163 lbf⋅ft) @ 3600–5200	197–200 kW (268–272 PS; 264–268 hp) @ 6000	450–460 N⋅m (332–339 lbf⋅ft) @ 2000–3000
Output	Electric motor, front	88 kW (120 PS; 118 hp)	202 N⋅m (149 lb⋅ft)	61 kW (83 PS; 82 hp)	292 N⋅m (215.4 lb⋅ft)
Output	Electric motor, rear	40 kW (54 PS; 54 hp)	121 N⋅m (89 lb⋅ft)	58.6 kW (80 PS; 79 hp)	168 N⋅m (124 lb⋅ft)
Consumption	City	42 mpg_{‑US} (5.6 l/100 km)		29 mpg_{‑US} (8.1 l/100 km)	
Consumption	Highway	41 mpg_{‑US} (5.7 l/100 km)		32 mpg_{‑US} (7.4 l/100 km)	
Consumption	Combined	41 mpg_{‑US} (5.7 l/100 km)		30 mpg_{‑US} (7.8 l/100 km)	

==== Markets ====
===== Japan =====
In Japan, grade levels offered for the Crown Crossover are the X, G, G Leather Package, G Advanced, G Advanced Leather Package, RS, and RS Advanced, with the latter two equipped with the T24A-FTS engine. Targeted monthly sales in Japan is set at 3,200 units. It went on sale in September 2022. In April 2024 there was a minor reshuffle, in which the Advanced and Leather Package models were discontinued. The new Z model instead occupied the slot between the G and the RS.

===== North America =====
The North American market Crown went on sale in October 2022 as a 2023 model year vehicle as a replacement to Toyota's former full-size sedan, the Avalon. Offered only in the Crossover body style and marketed simply as "Crown", grade levels available in the US and Canada are XLE, Limited, and Platinum. The latter is equipped with the T24A-FTS engine and a standard Adaptive Variable Suspension. The North American market Crown does not wear the Crown emblem at the front and the steering wheel; it instead wears Toyota's corporate emblem. It is also not equipped with the full-width daytime running light bar available in the Japanese market model, which is replaced with a chrome piece. In 2024, for the 2025 model year, the Nightshade grade was added. In 2026, for the 2027 model year, the XLE, Limited and Nightshade grades upgraded to the fifth-generation hybrid system, and the Platinum grade upgraded to the Hybrid MAX powertrain.

===== China =====
In China, the model is sold as the Crown SportCross by FAW Toyota as an imported model. It was introduced at the December 2022 Guangzhou Auto Show. It was offered in two grades: 2.5L HEV Premium Edition and the 2.4L HEV AWD Supreme Edition.

===== Argentina =====
It was launched in Argentina on 12 June 2024. It is only offered with the Hybrid 2.4T engine, in one single trim level: Platinum HEV 2.4T 6A/T.

===== Taiwan =====
In Taiwan, where it is imported and sold by Hotai Motor, sales commenced on 30 March 2023. It is the first Crown model to be offered in Taiwan since 1974, when the nameplate was withdrawn from the market after production of the third generation ended. Like North America, the model is offered only in the Crossover body style and marketed simply as "Crown". It is available in two grade levels: Noble (Chinese: 貴族版; pinyin: Guìzúbǎn) with the A25A-FXS engine and Royal (Chinese: 皇家版; pinyin: Huángjiābǎn) with the T24A-FTS engine.

===== South Korea =====
The South Korean market Crown went on sale on 5 June 2023. This is the first Crown model in South Korea to be offered since 1972 when the nameplate was withdrawn from the market after production agreement with its local partner Shinjin Motors ended. Similar to other markets, it is available with two grades with the hybrid powertrain as standard: 2.5 L Hybrid and 2.4L Dual Boost Hybrid.

===== Middle East =====
The 2023 Crown went on sale in the Middle Eastern markets on 11 June 2023. In Bahrain, it's available in three grades: Mid-Lux with the A25A-FXS engine and High-Low & High with the T24A-FTS engine. In Saudi Arabia, it's available in two grades: Premium & Majesta. In the United Arab Emirates, it's available in two grades: XLE and Platinum. This marks the first Crown model to be sold in the Gulf Cooperation Council markets since the 2000 model year after the production of the 10th generation ended.

==== Safety ====
The 2023 model year Crown was awarded "Top Safety Pick+" by IIHS.

IIHS scores (2023 model year)
Small overlap front (driver)	Good	
Small overlap front (passenger)	Good	
Moderate overlap front (original test)	Good	
Side (updated test)	Good	
Headlights	Good	Acceptable
Front crash prevention: vehicle-to-pedestrian (Day)	Superior	
Front crash prevention: vehicle-to-pedestrian (Night)	Superior	
Seatbelt reminders	Good	
Child seat anchors (LATCH) ease of use	Good+	

=== Sport (S236; 2023) ===
Sixteenth generation Sport
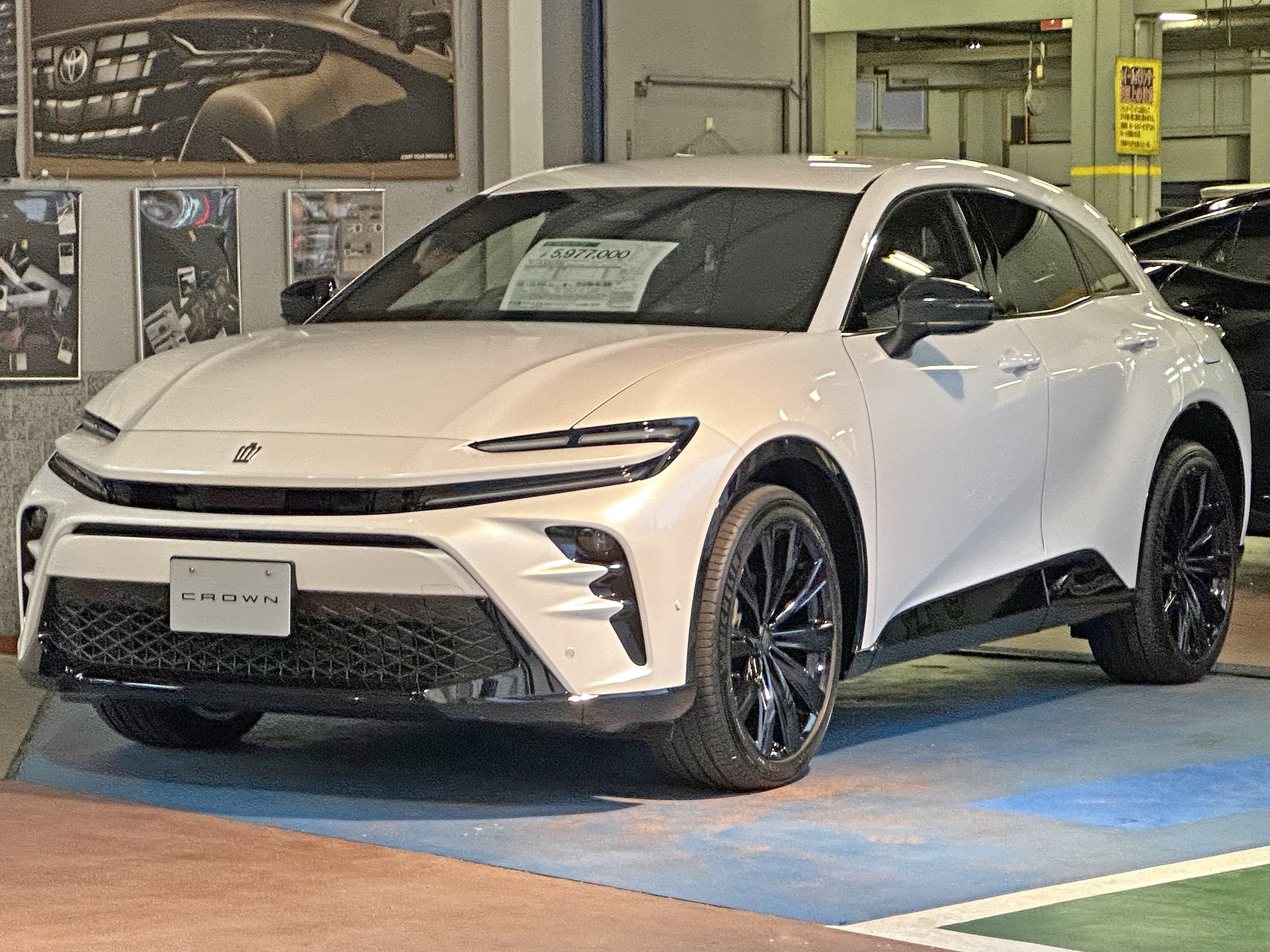
- 2024 Crown Sport Z (AZSH36W, Japan)

Overview
- Model code: S236
- Production: October 2023 – present
- Assembly: Japan: Toyota, Aichi (Tsutsumi plant)
- Designer: Yukihiro Koide, Lu Yi and Keita Kominami (exterior); Koji Minakawa and Junya Takahashi (interior)

Body and chassis
- Class: Compact crossover SUV
- Body style: 5-door SUV
- Layout: Transverse front-engine, four-wheel-drive (E-Four)
- Platform: TNGA: GA-K
- Related: Toyota Crown Crossover; Toyota Crown Signia/Estate; Lexus RX (ALA10/ALH10); Toyota Highlander/Kluger/Crown Kluger (XU70)

Powertrain
- Engine: Gasoline hybrid: 2.5 L A25A-FXS I4 (AZSH36)
- Electric motor: List: 2× permanent magnet synchronous: 2.5 L: 3NM (front); 4NM (rear)
- Power output: List: 2.5 L: 137 kW (184 hp; 186 PS) (gasoline engine only); 88 kW (118 hp; 120 PS) (3NM motor); 40 kW (54 hp; 54 PS) (4NM motor); 172 kW (231 hp; 234 PS) (combined system output)
- Transmission: eCVT (2.5 L)
- Hybrid drivetrain: Power-split or plug-in (2.5 L)
- Battery: 5 Ah nickel–metal hydride

Dimensions
- Wheelbase: 2,770 mm (109.1 in)
- Length: 4,720 mm (185.8 in)
- Width: 1,880 mm (74.0 in)
- Height: 1,565–1,570 mm (61.6–61.8 in)
- Curb weight: 1,810 kg (3,990 lb)

The Crown Sport was previewed as a prototype model in July 2022 alongside the Crossover, Sedan, and Estate models. Previously, the same model was showcased as a battery electric concept car called the "Crossover EV" in December 2021. The Crown Sport Hybrid launched in October 2023 for Japan, with the plug-in hybrid to follow in December 2023.

In September 2026, a Sport Z was added.

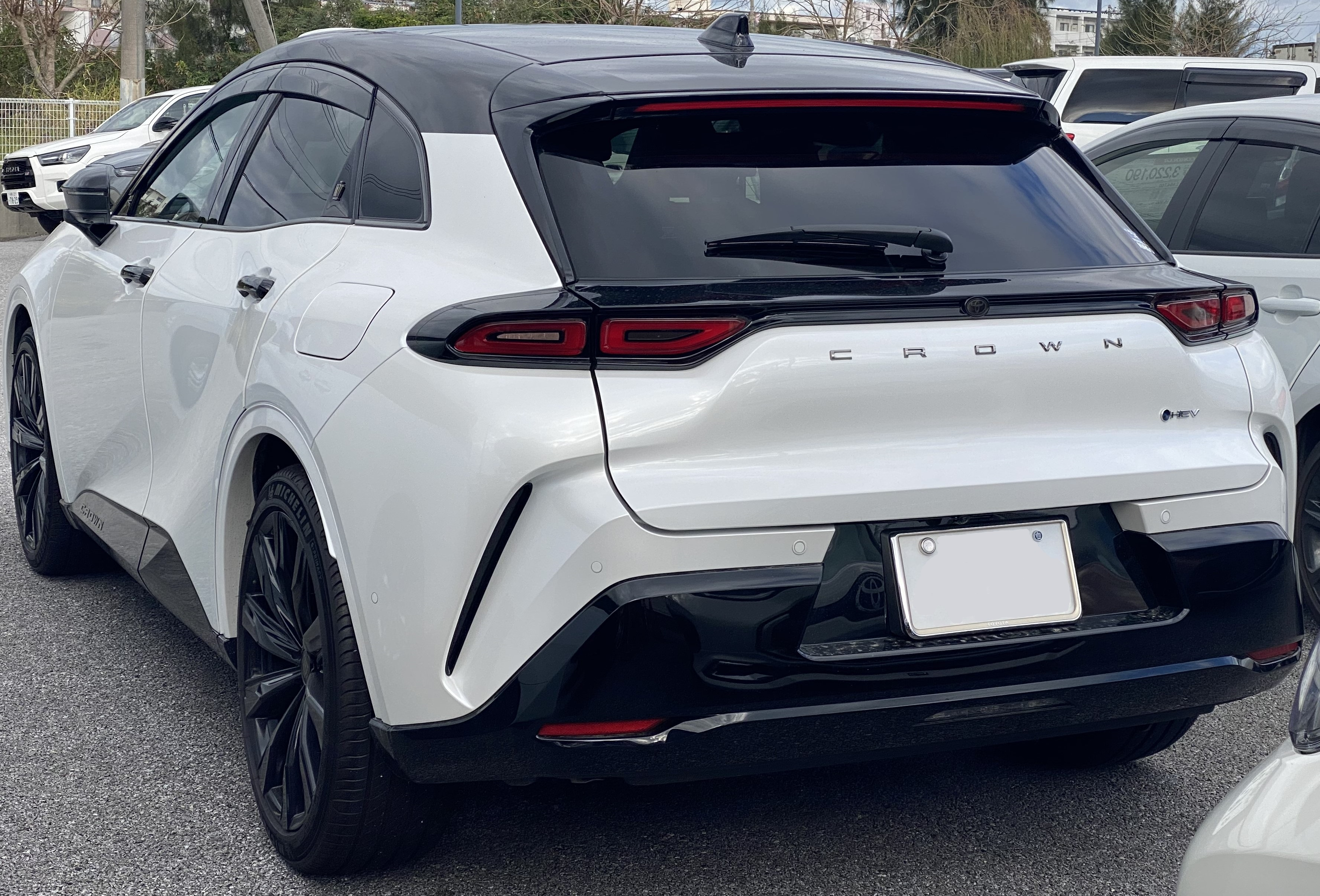
Rear view

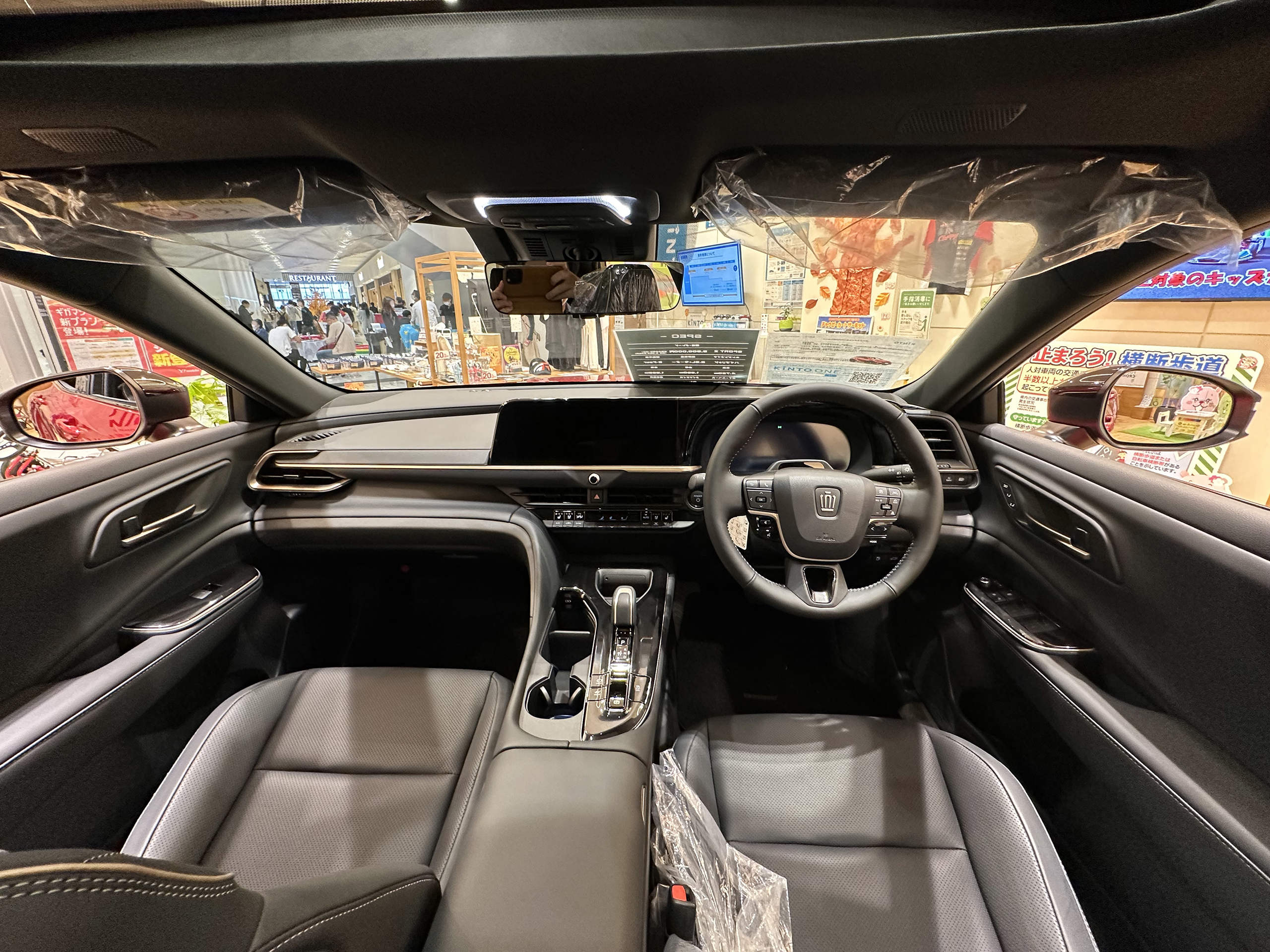
Interior

==== Markets ====
===== Japan =====
The Crown Sport hybrid launched in Japan on 6 October 2023, with orders beginning the same day. It was initially available solely in one trim, Z. The plug-in hybrid RS variant followed later in December.

In September 2026 the Sport Z plug-in hybrid grade was added. Its 2.5 L A25A-FXS engine produces 225 kW (302 hp; 306 PS).

===== Taiwan =====
In September 2026, the Crown Sport was announced for the Taiwanese market alongside the updated Crown Crossover, with sales commenced on 27 October 2026. It is the first export market for the Crown Sport, and the first market to receive a left-hand drive version. It will be available in both hybrid and plug-in hybrid variants.

=== Sedan (S230/232; 2023) ===
Sixteenth generation Sedan
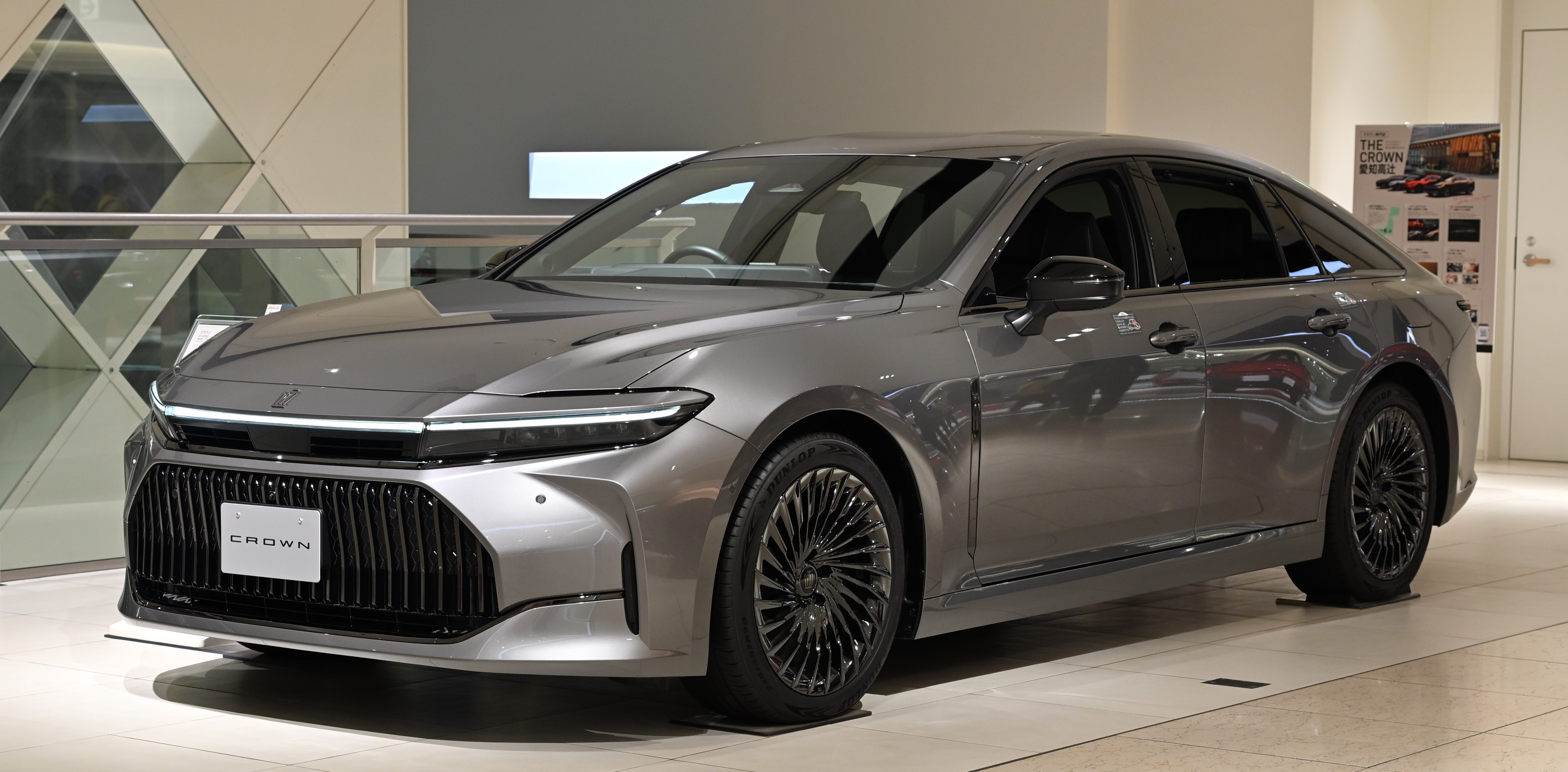
- Crown Z Hybrid sedan (Japan)

Overview
- Model code: S230 (FCEV); S232 (HEV)
- Production: November 2023 – present
- Assembly: Japan: Toyota, Aichi (Motomachi plant)
- Designer: Yoshiaki Miyazaki, Yuri Okubo, Sho Arai, Makoto Wakihara, and Keiji Nishi (exterior); Norihiro Matsubara, Yuki Ujita, and Satoshi Suzuki (interior)

Body and chassis
- Body style: 4-door sedan
- Layout: Longitudinal front-engine, rear-wheel-drive
- Platform: TNGA: GA-L
- Related: Toyota Mirai (JPD20)

Powertrain
- Engine: Gasoline hybrid: 2.5 L A25A-FXS I4 (HEV, AZSH32)
- Electric motor: 2NM permanent magnet synchronous (HEV; AZSH32); 3KM permanent magnet synchronous (FCEV, KZSM30)
- Power output: List: HEV: 136 kW (182 hp; 185 PS) (gasoline engine only); 132 kW (177 hp; 179 PS) (2NM motor); 180 kW (241 hp; 245 PS) (combined system output); FCEV: 134 kW (180 hp; 182 PS)
- Transmission: 10-speed "Multi Stage Hybrid System" automatic (hybrid)
- Hybrid drivetrain: Power-split
- Battery: 4.3 Ah lithium-ion (HEV); 4.0 Ah lithium-ion (FCEV)
- Range: 820 km (510 mi) (FCEV)

Dimensions
- Wheelbase: 3,000 mm (118.1 in)
- Length: 5,030 mm (198.0 in)
- Width: 1,890 mm (74.4 in)
- Height: 1,475 mm (58.1 in)
- Curb weight: 2,020 kg (4,453 lb) (HEV); 2,000 kg (4,409 lb) (FCEV)

The Crown Sedan is a four-door sedan that was showcased as a pre-production model in July 2022, alongside the Crown Crossover, Crown Sport, and Crown Estate, and was scheduled for a 2023 release. It uses the same platform as the second-generation Mirai with its longitudinal engine and rear-wheel-drive layout. Compared to the fifteenth generation, the sixteenth-generation sedan is 120 mm (4.7 in) longer in length and 150 mm (5.9 in) longer in wheelbase.

After a series of introductions, the Crown Sedan was launched in Japan on 2 November 2023 and went on sale on 13 November. Targeted monthly sales in the country is 600 units.

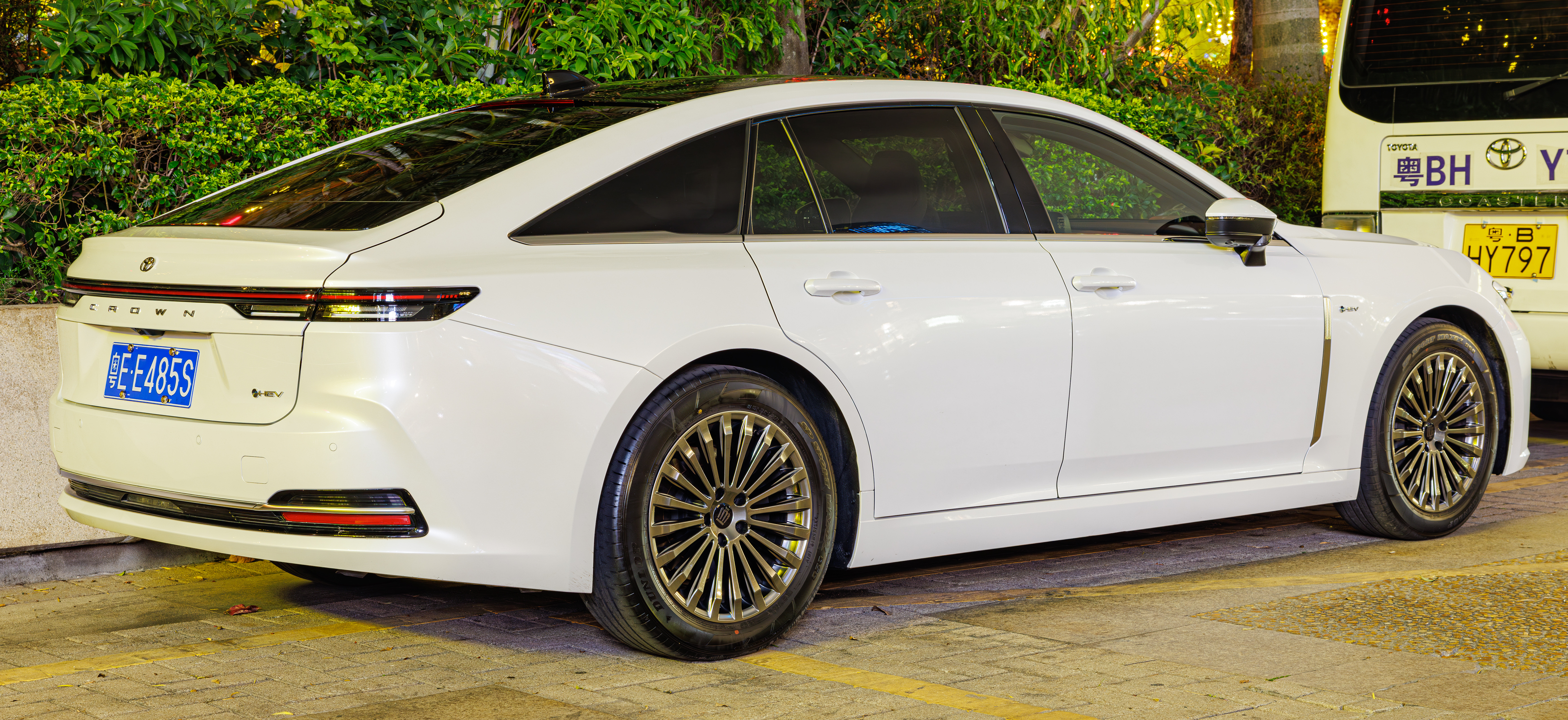
Rear view

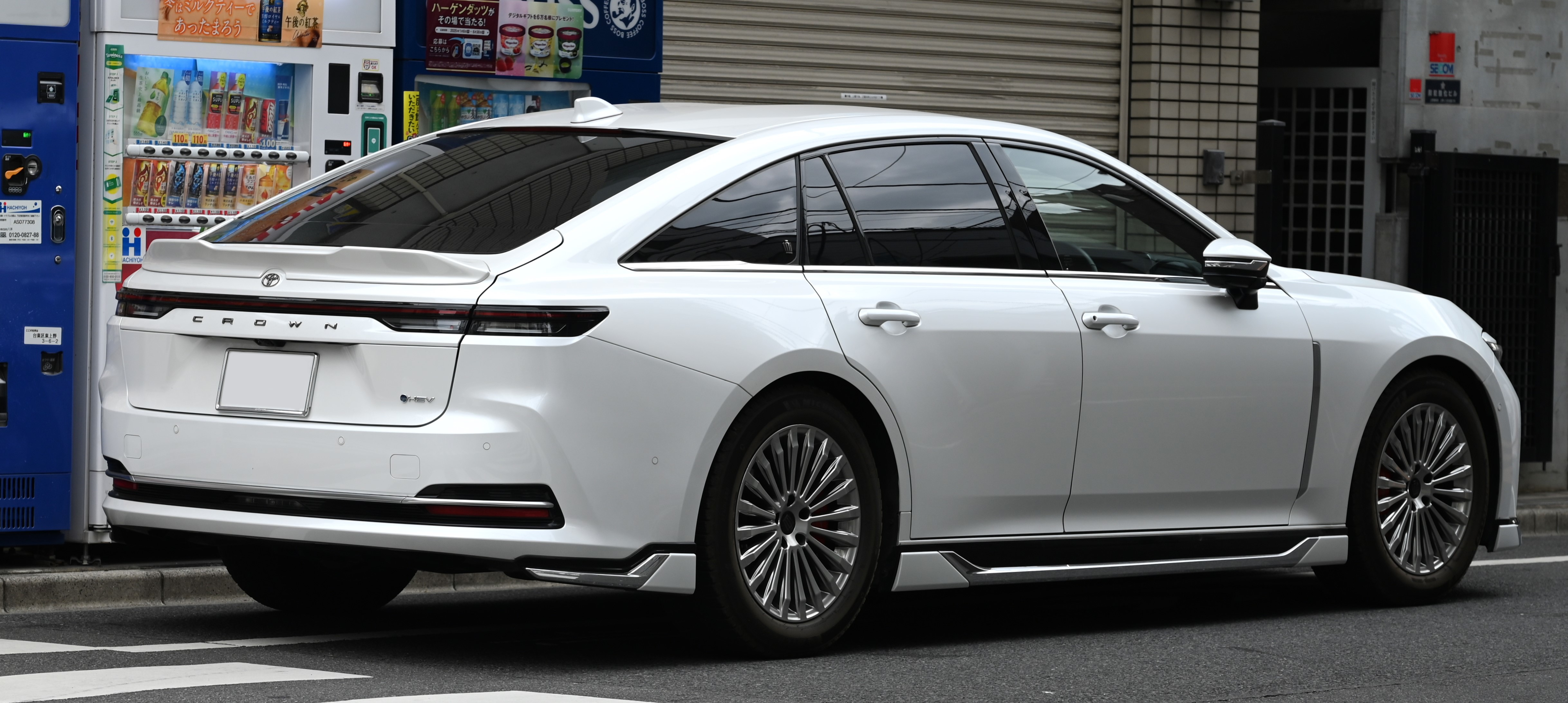
Rear view (with optional Modellista parts)

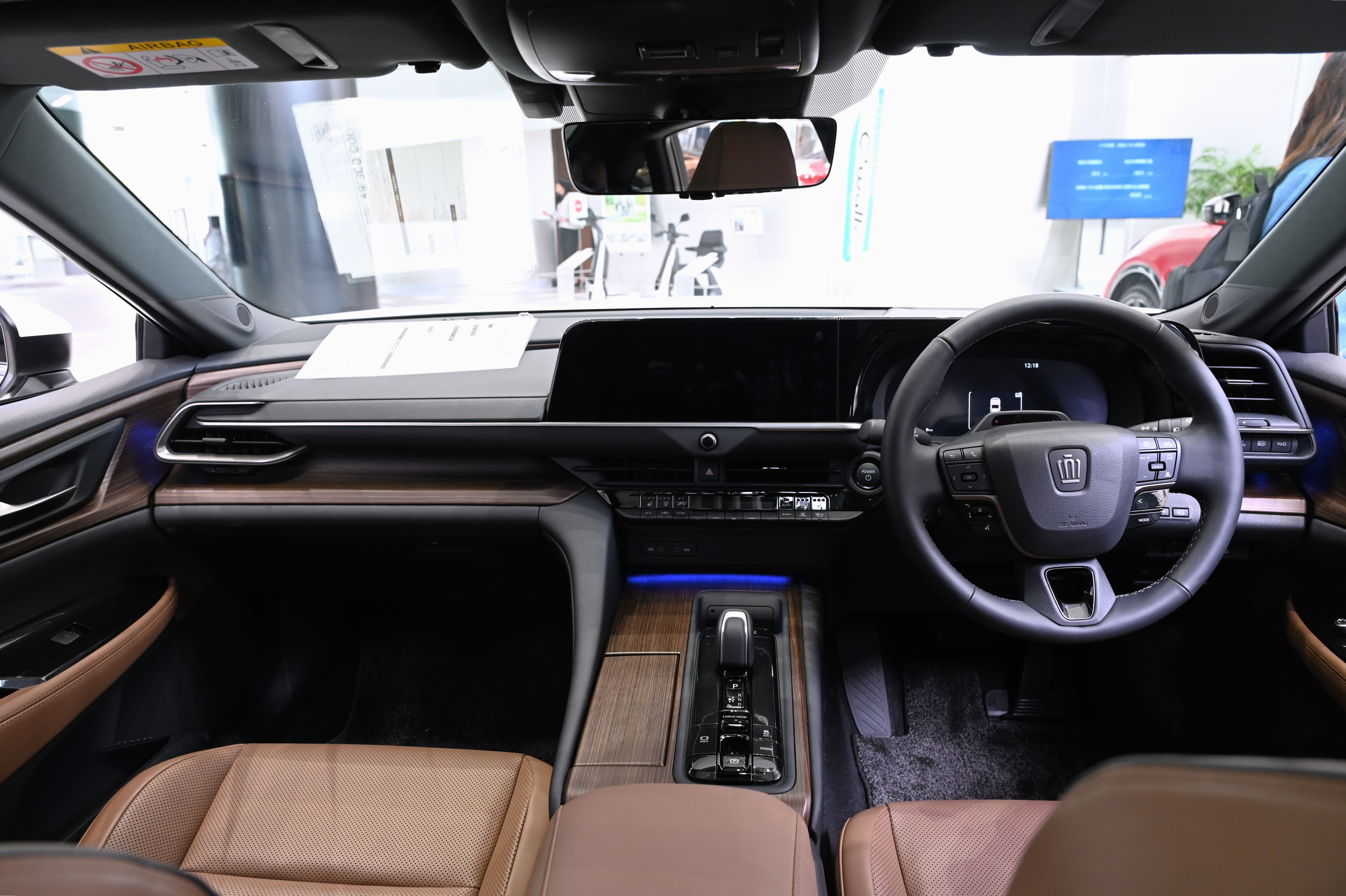
Interior

==== Markets ====
===== Japan =====
In Japan, the Crown Sedan is marketed simply as "Crown" (though the "Sedan" designation is used to distinguish it from the other variants) and is available in one grade, Z, for both the fuel cell (FCEV) and hybrid (HEV) configurations.

The FCEV model adopts the same fuel cell system as the second-generation Mirai. Equipped with three high-pressure hydrogen tanks and a fuel cell, it has an approximate range of 820 km (509.5 mi) with just three minutes of hydrogen refilling time.

The HEV model is powered by a 2.5-litre A25A-FXS engine with a first application of a multi-stage hybrid system which combines the engine, two motors, and stepped gears.

The 70th anniversary special edition was released in 2025. The sedan had 20-inch alloy wheels finished in matte black. The car was offered in special two-tone paint. The interior has "70th anniversary" emblems in the interior and optional "70th" decals on the outside.

In the same year, Toyota also released another special edition, "Matte Metal Edition". Based on the Z grade, this car is completely matte metal colour. The interior combines black luster and black wood-grain panels, like "THE 70th" model, matte metal logo on the interior.

Both models are offered in two variants, HEV and PHEV. Both models are also offered in four body styles.

In September 2026, the entry-level G was released. The 13.2-inch OLED rear seat display is available as a dealer-installed option.

===== China =====
In November 2022, FAW Toyota announced plans to sell the sixteenth-generation Crown Sedan in China as an imported model, marking the return of this model to the Chinese market after the domestically produced fourteenth-generation sedan was discontinued in 2020. It was showcased in a mock-up prototype form at the Guangzhou Auto Show in December 2022. A working prototype of the FCEV model, built to Chinese specifications, was later showcased by Toyota at Fuji Speedway during the 2023 Fuji 24 Hours endurance race.

The Crown sedan went on sale in China in April 2024 with two grades available, Premium and Extreme. Like other Crown-branded vehicles, the Crown sedan is distributed through FAW Toyota dealerships.

===== Indonesia =====
At the 2025 Indonesia International Auto Show, Toyota Astra Motor introduced the Crown Sedan FCEV as an imported model alongside the locally-assembled bZ4X and Urban Cruiser BEV, with availability to be announced at a later date. This marks the return of the Crown to consumer sales in the Indonesian market for the first time since 2003.

=== Estate/Signia (S238; 2024) ===
Sixteenth generation Estate/Signia
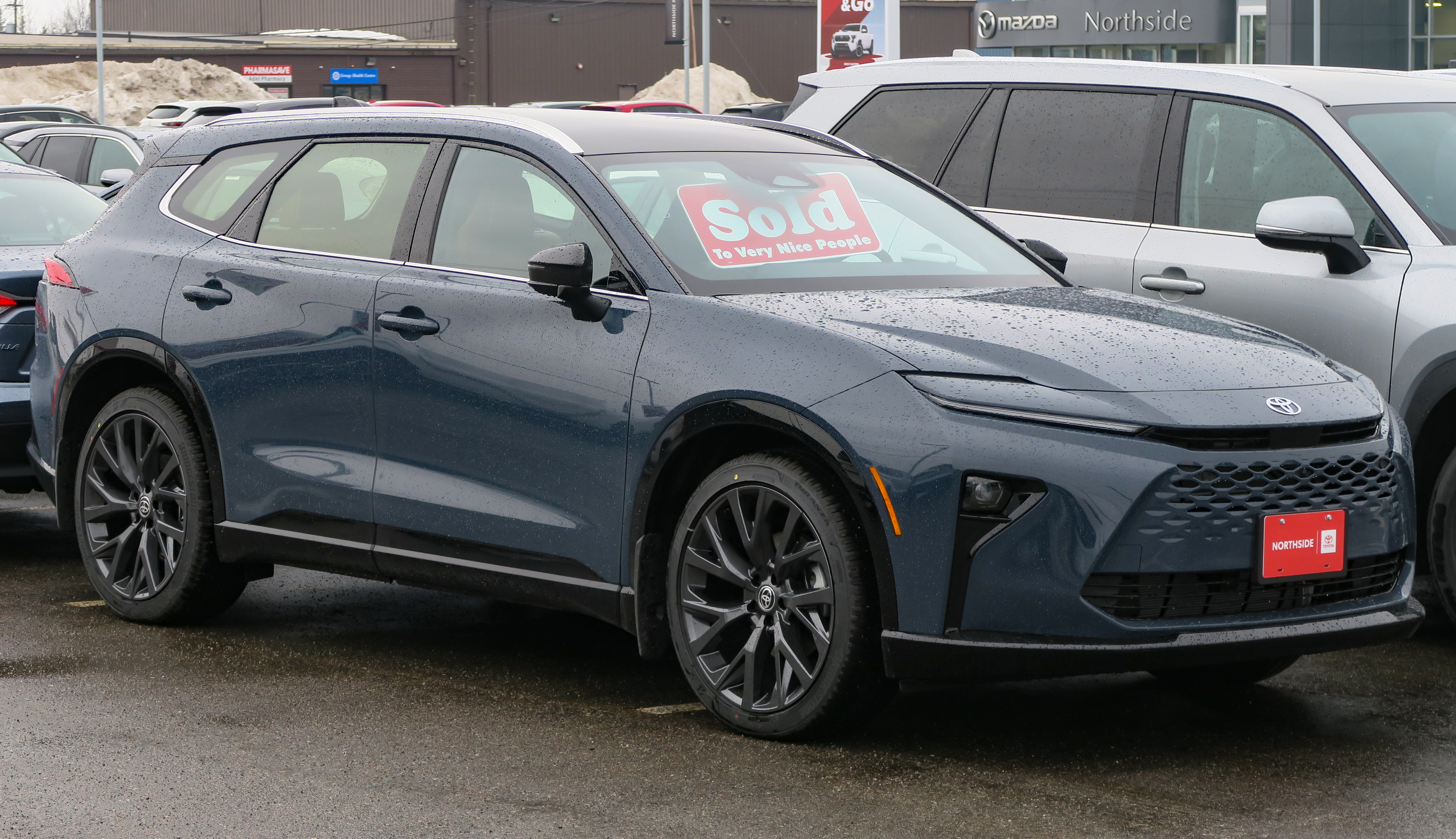
- 2025 Toyota Crown Signia Limited (AZSH38, Canada)

Overview
- Model code: S238
- Production: June 2024 – present
- Model years: 2025–present (North America)
- Assembly: Japan: Toyota City, Aichi (Tsutsumi plant)
- Designer: Ken Nagasaka, Yukiko Yano, Ren Tokunaga, and Junwon Han (exterior); Mitsunori Kakihata and Toshiya Takahashi (interior)

Body and chassis
- Class: Mid-size crossover SUV
- Body style: 5-door SUV
- Layout: Transverse front-engine, four-wheel-drive (E-Four)
- Platform: TNGA: GA-K
- Related: Toyota Camry (XV80); Toyota Crown Crossover; Toyota Crown Sport; Toyota Highlander/Kluger/Crown Kluger (XU70); Lexus RX (ALA10/ALH10)

Powertrain
- Engine: Gasoline hybrid: 2.5 L A25A-FXS I4 (AZSH38); Gasoline plug-in hybrid: 2.5 L A25A-FXS I4 (AZSH39W)
- Power output: 179 kW (240 hp) (AZSH38); 225 kW (302 hp) (AZSH39W)
- Transmission: eCVT (2.5 L)
- Hybrid drivetrain: Power-split
- Battery: 5 Ah nickel–metal hydride

Dimensions
- Wheelbase: 2,850 mm (112.2 in)
- Length: 4,930 mm (194.1 in)
- Width: 1,880 mm (74.0 in)
- Height: 1,620 mm (63.8 in)
- Curb weight: 1,890 kg (4,167 lb) (HEV); 2,080 kg (4,586 lb) (PHEV)

Chronology
- Predecessor: Toyota Venza (XU80) (North America)

The Crown Estate crossover with its slightly low-roof styling was previewed as a mock-up model in July 2022, and is available in both hybrid and plug-in hybrid powertrains.

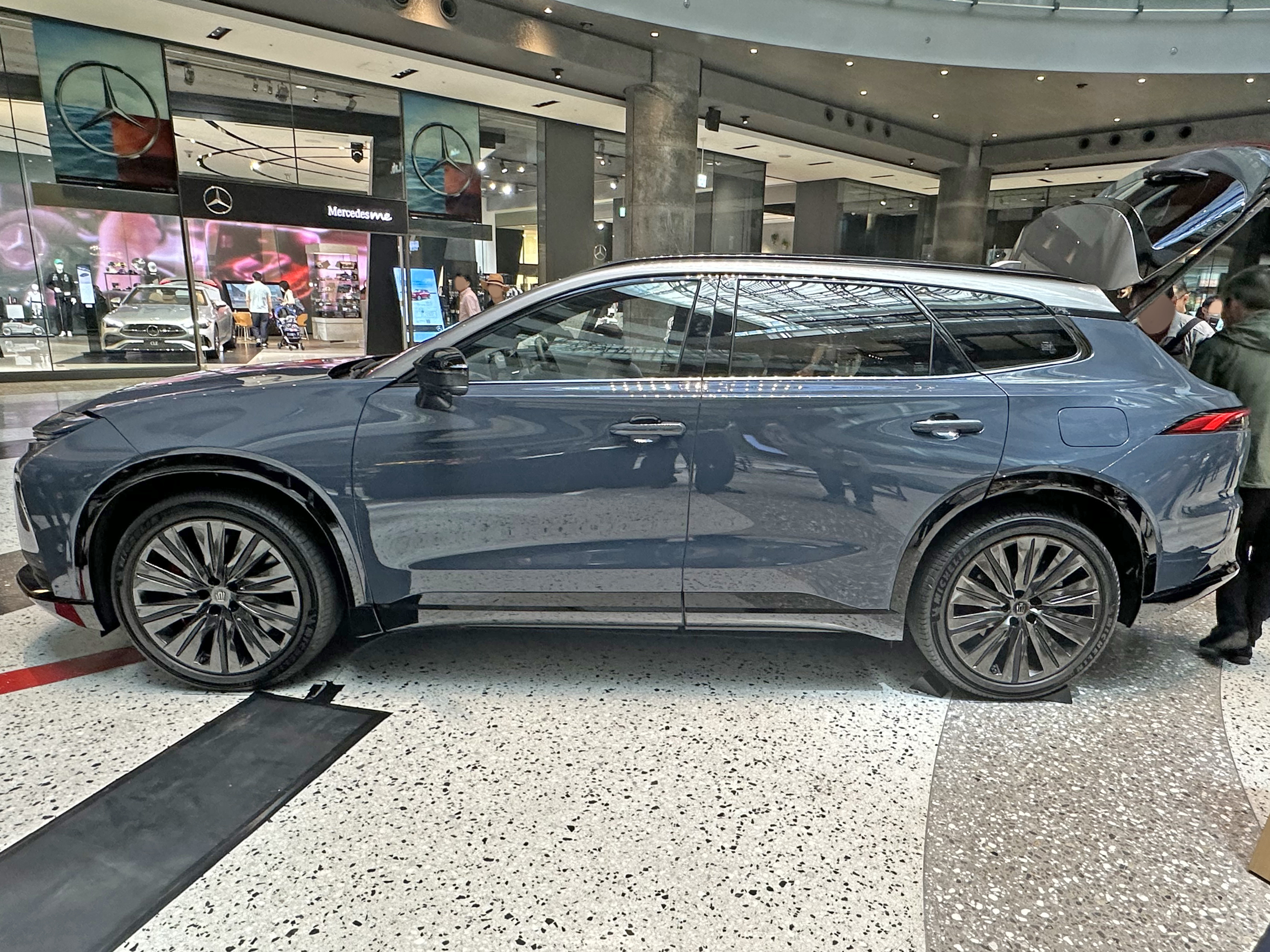
Side view

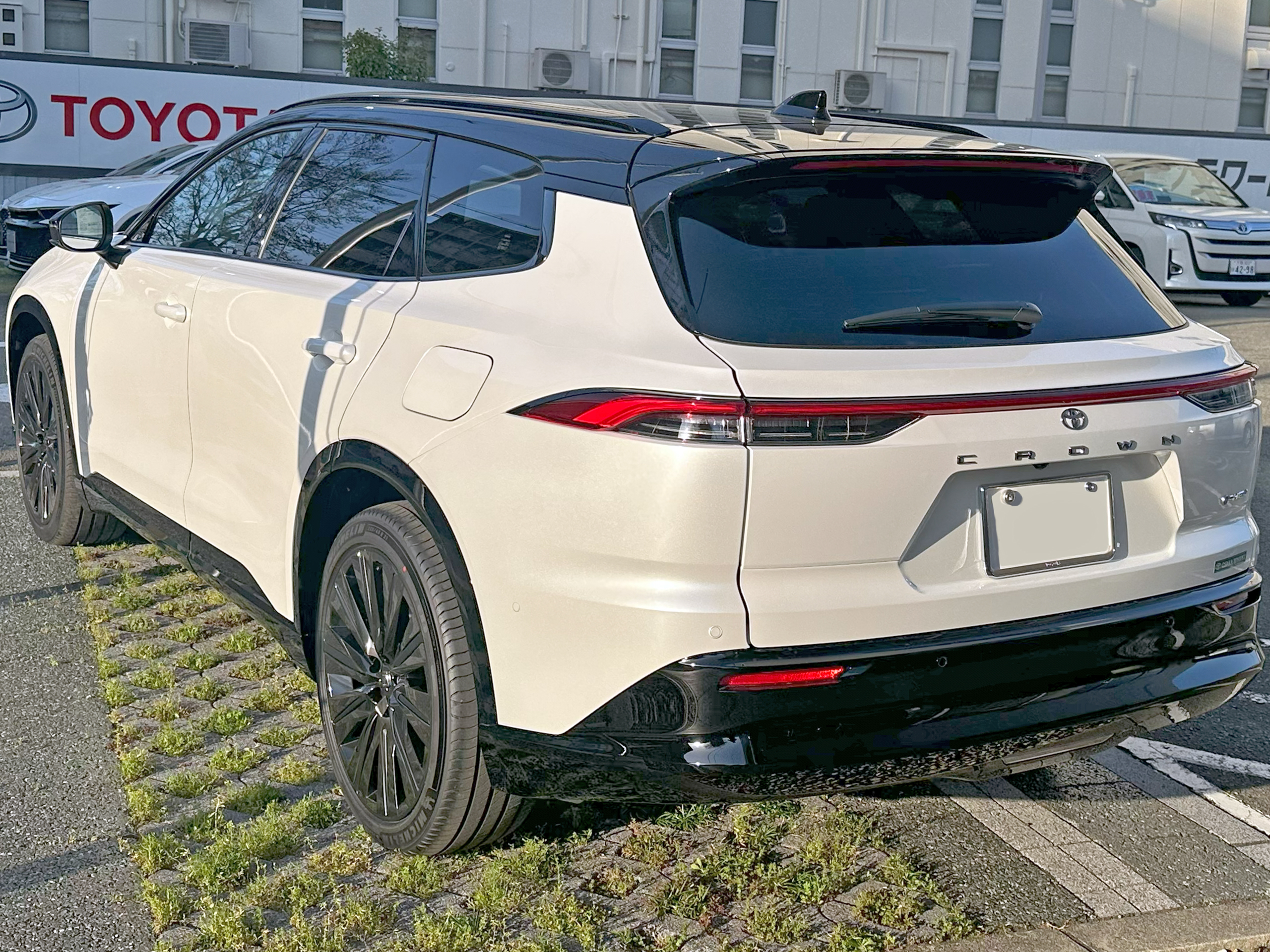
Crown Estate Z Rear view

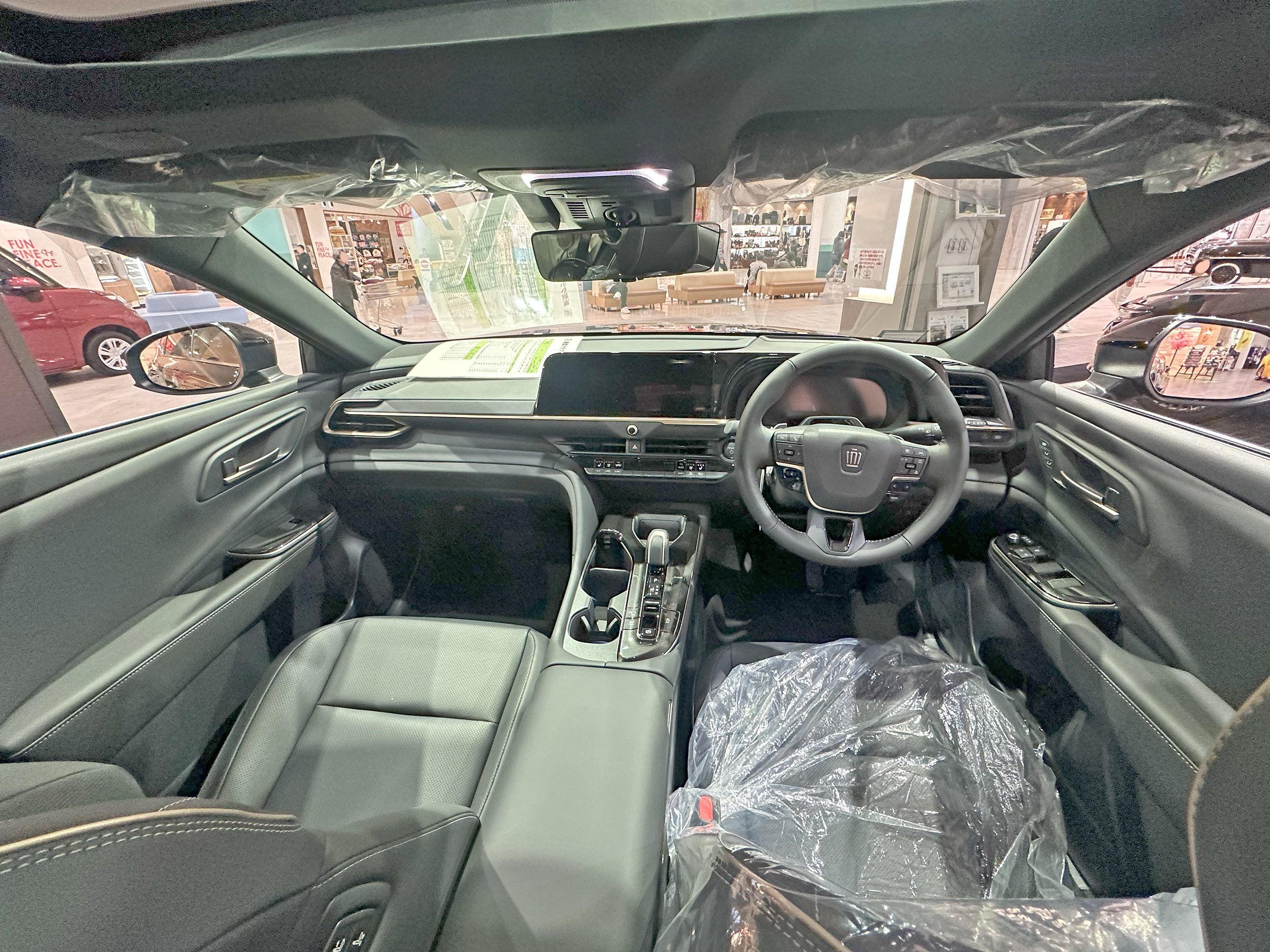
Interior

==== Markets ====
===== Japan =====
The Crown Estate was originally planned to be release in March 2024 in Japan, but was delayed to July to allow for further development. It was delayed again as a result of a certification scandal. The Crown Estate finally went on sale in Japan on 13 March 2025 in RS PHEV and Z HEV trims.

===== North America =====
The model went on sale in North America in June 2024 for the 2025 model year as the Crown Signia. It replaced the smaller Venza. The Crown Signia is available in XLE and Limited trims, powered by a 2.5-litre naturally aspirated inline-four gasoline hybrid engine paired with two electric motors (all-wheel drive). The system has a total output of 181 kW (243 hp; 246 PS).

In 2025, for the 2026 model year, the two tone paint exterior became available on the Limited trim, pairing a black roof.

In 2026, for the 2027 model year, the Inked paint color replaced the Black paint color.

==== Safety ====
The 2025 model year Crown Signia was awarded "Top Safety Pick" by IIHS.

IIHS scores (2025 model year)
Small overlap front	Good
Moderate overlap front (original test)	Good
Side (updated test)	Good
Headlights	Good
Front crash prevention: vehicle-to-vehicle 2.0	Good
Front crash prevention: vehicle-to-pedestrian	Good
Child seat anchors (LATCH) ease of use	Good+

== Nameplate usage for other models ==
=== Crown Comfort and Crown Sedan (XS10; 1995–2018) ===
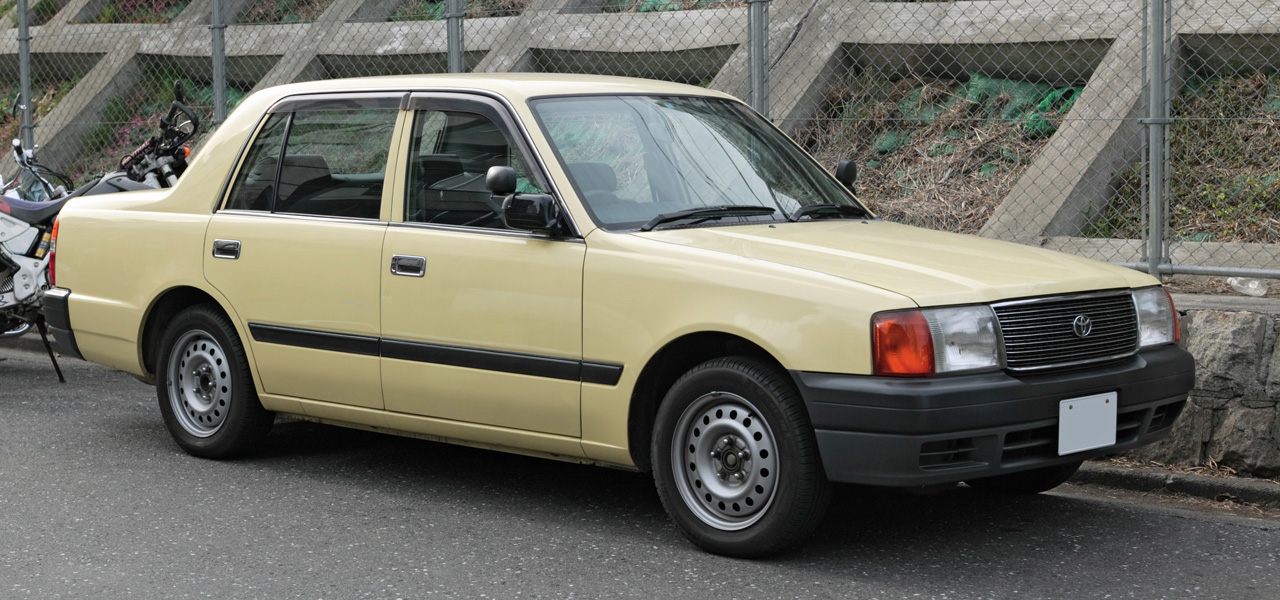

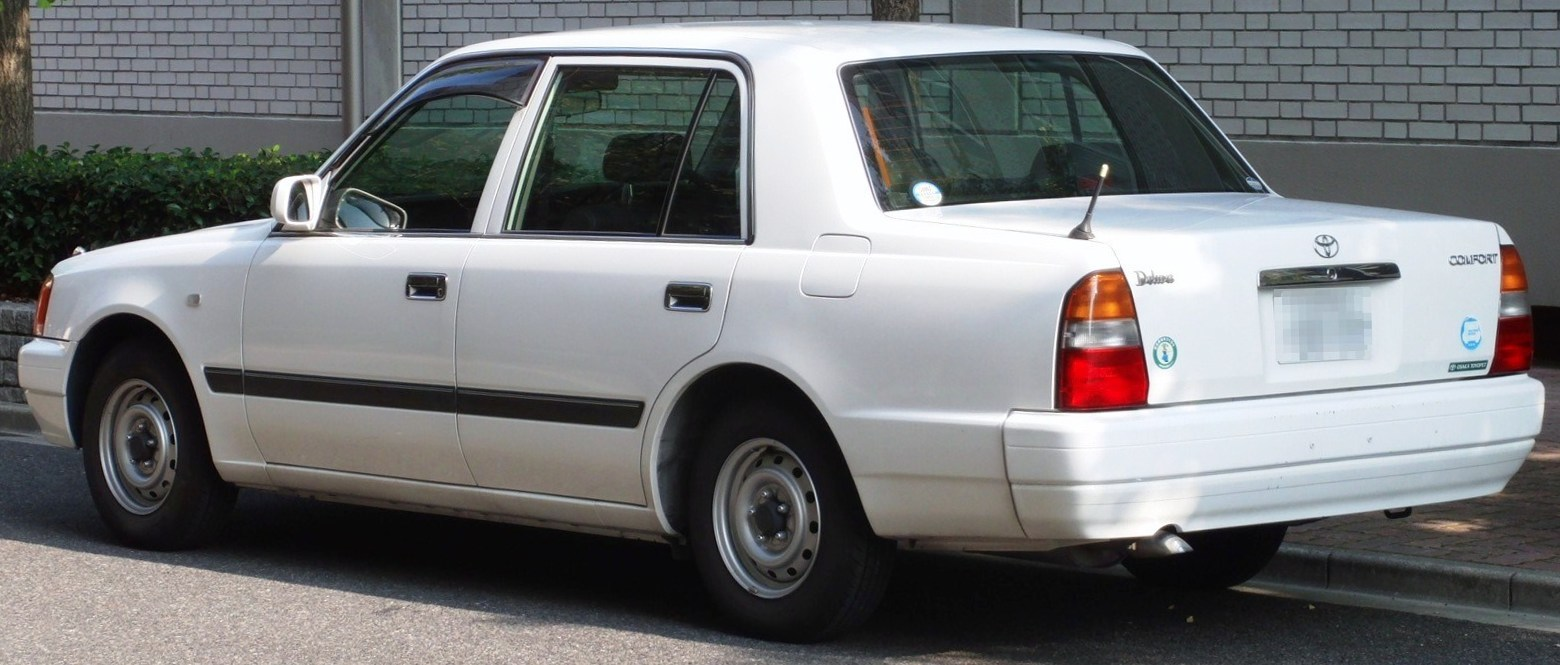
Crown Comfort

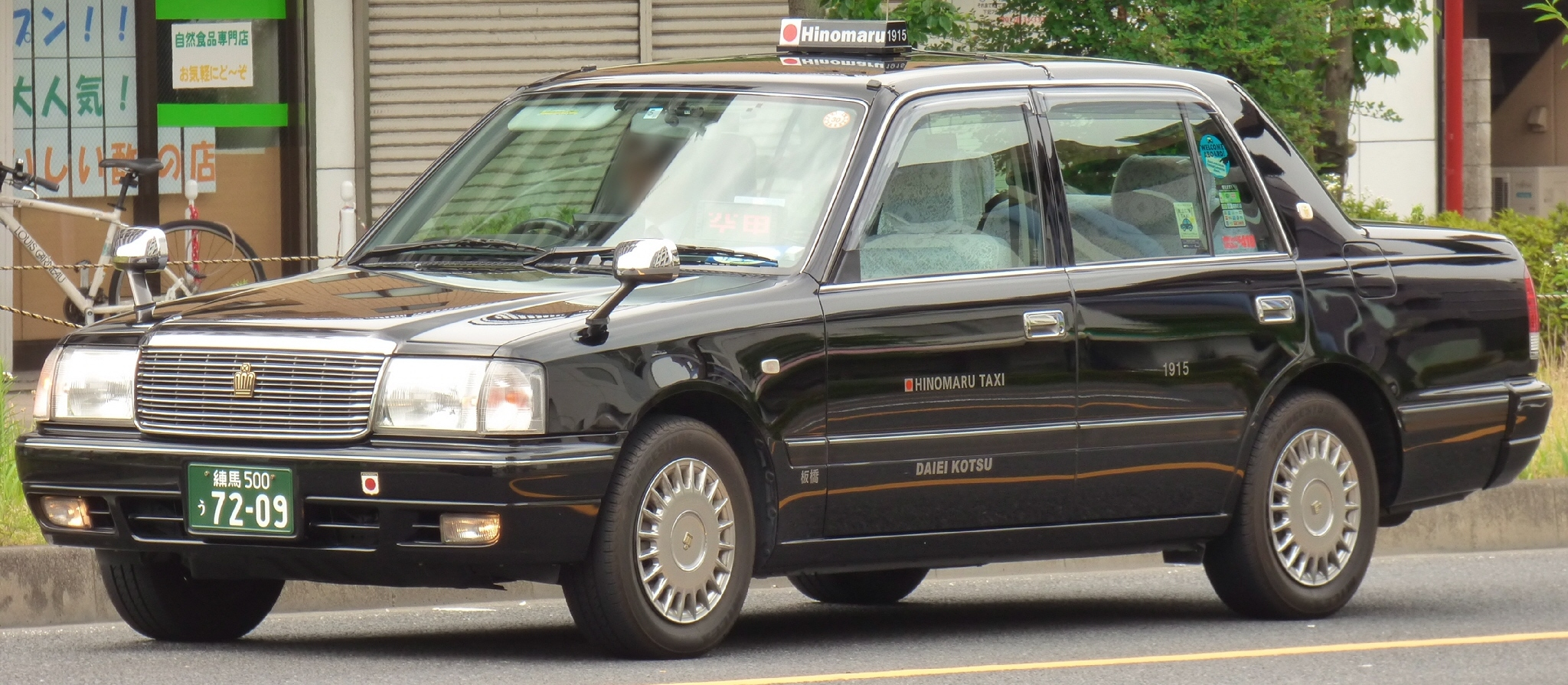

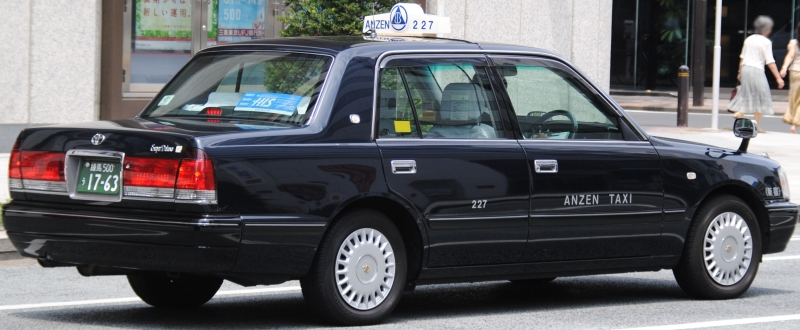
Crown Sedan

To replace the commercial variant of the S130 Crown sedan, which was popular with taxicab operators, Toyota released a long-wheelbase version of the Comfort fleet sedan under the Crown Comfort nameplate. An upscale variant of the Crown Comfort with better appointments was sold exclusively in Japan as the Crown Sedan. While these models bore the Crown nameplate, they were based on the outgoing X80 series Mark II. The Crown Comfort was popular among taxicab operators in Japan, Hong Kong and Singapore, but gradually fell out of favor as better-appointed vehicles become available at competitive cost.

The Crown Comfort was removed from Toyota's Japanese website on 25 May 2017, with production of existing orders ceasing in January 2018. It was replaced by the JPN Taxi which was launched at the 45th Tokyo Motor Show in October 2017.

=== "Crown" sub-brand for the Chinese market (2021–present) ===
In April 2021, Toyota used the "Crown" nameplate as a sub-brand for high-end models sold by FAW Toyota in China, shortly after the S210 Crown sedan was discontinued in mid-2020. The first models introduced were the Crown Kluger (simplified Chinese: 皇冠陆放; traditional Chinese: 皇冠陸放; pinyin: Huángguàn Lùfàng) SUV (rebadged Highlander) and Crown Vellfire (simplified Chinese: 皇冠威尔法; traditional Chinese: 皇冠威爾法; pinyin: Huángguàn Wēiěrfǎ) minivan (renamed from Vellfire). Both models feature the Crown logo replacing the front Toyota logo, and in other places such as the hubcaps, instrument cluster and steering wheel (Crown Kluger only).

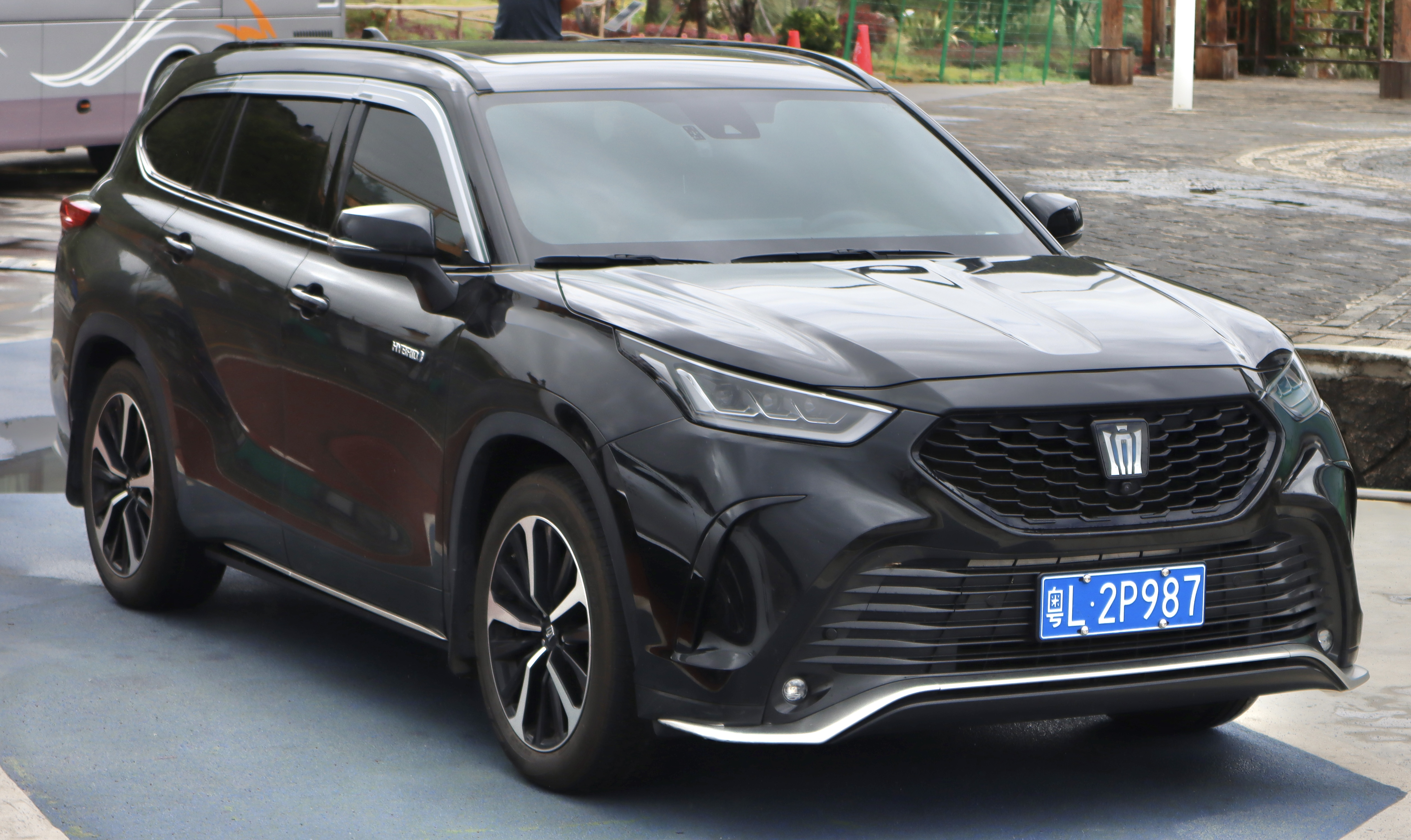
Crown Kluger

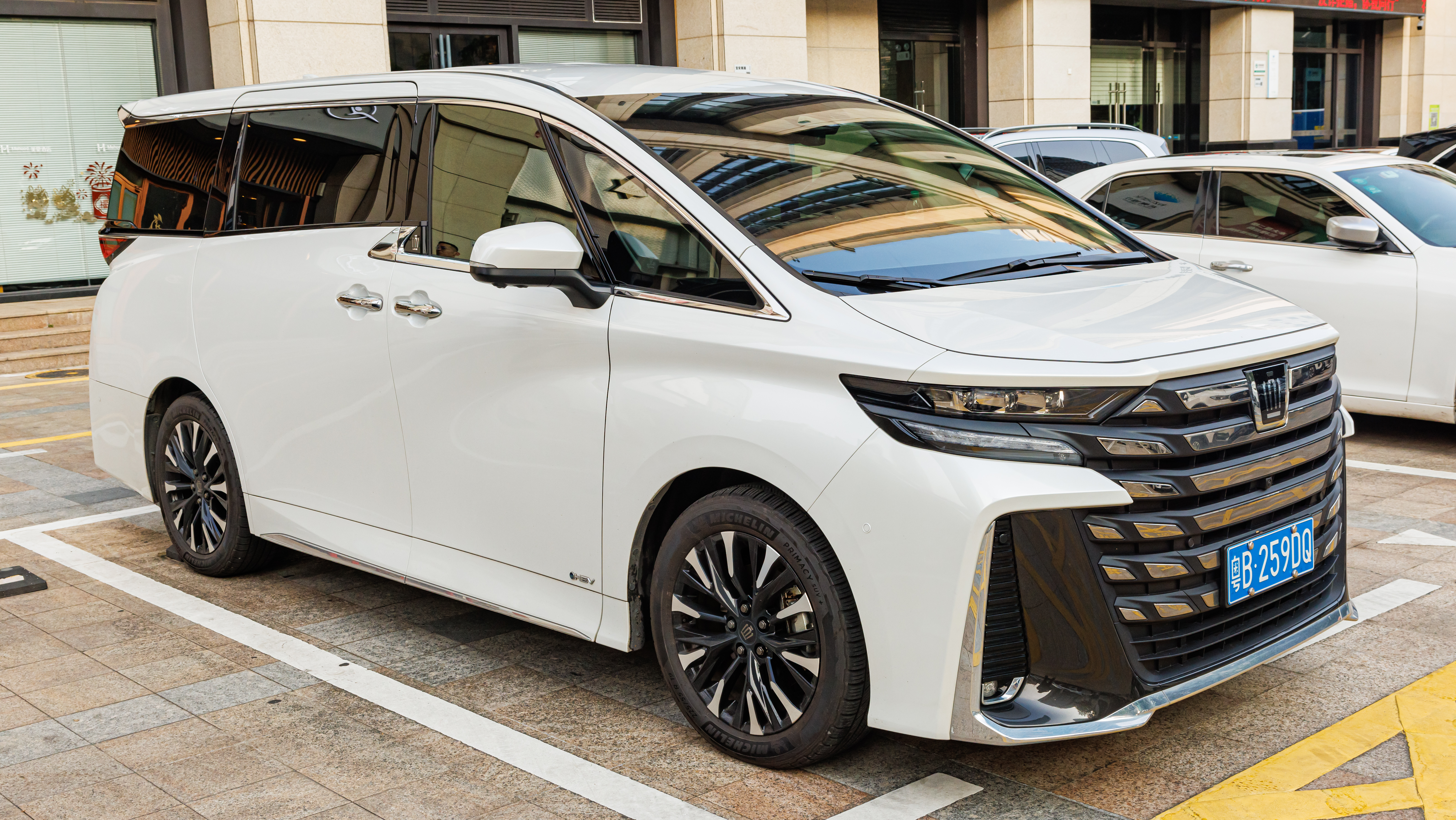
Crown Vellfire

== Trademark dispute ==
In November 2015, Wuhan Municipal Sanitation Machinery Co., Ltd. sued Toyota and a Wuhan-based automobile dealer for trademark infringement in China based on the similarity of the Crown logo to Wuhan Municipal Sanitation Machinery's China Trademark Registration No. 217925. Toyota had requested cancellation of this trademark registration in December 2014, but its request was denied by the China Trademark Office (CTMO).

== Motorsport ==
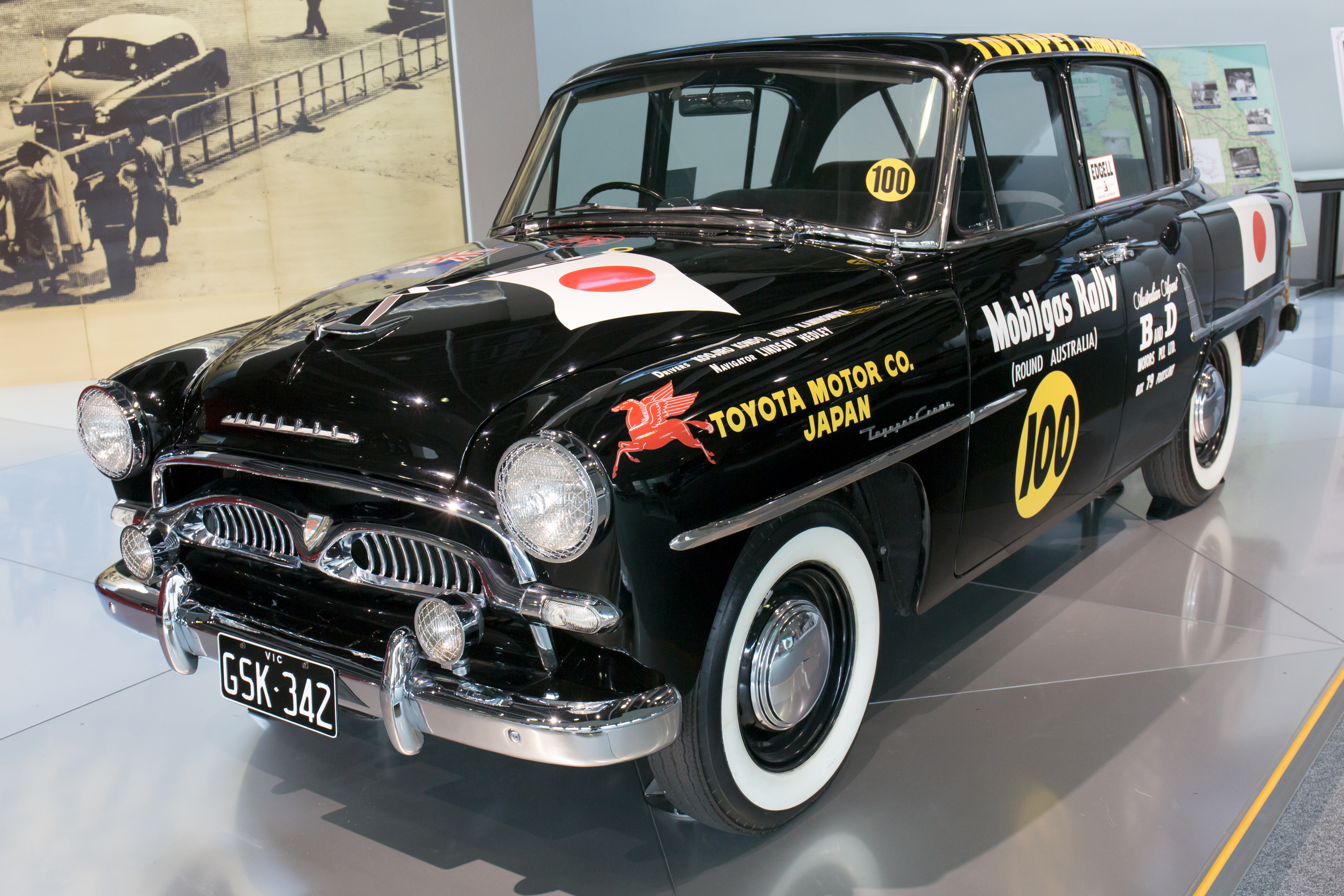

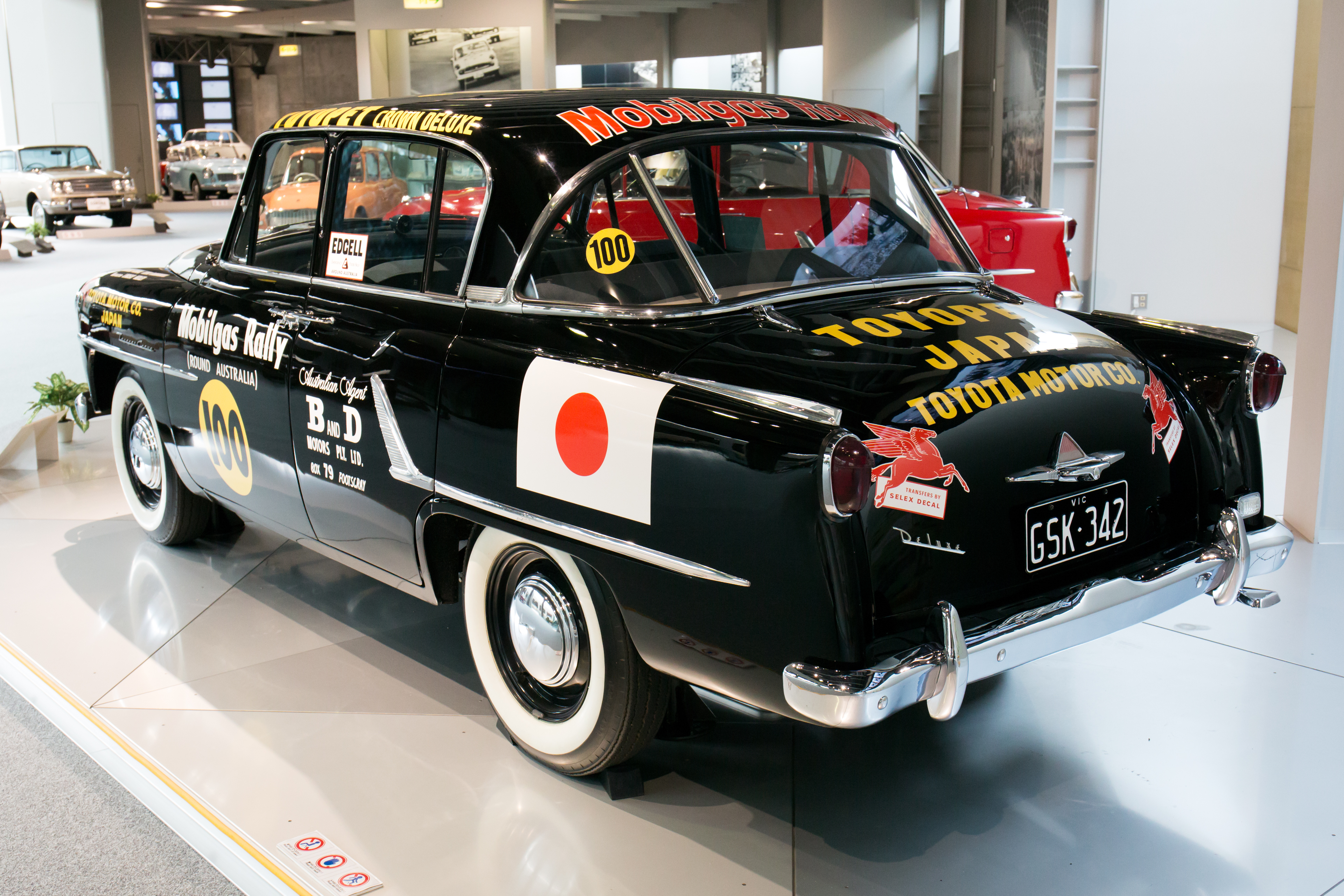
Replica car from the 5th Australian Rally

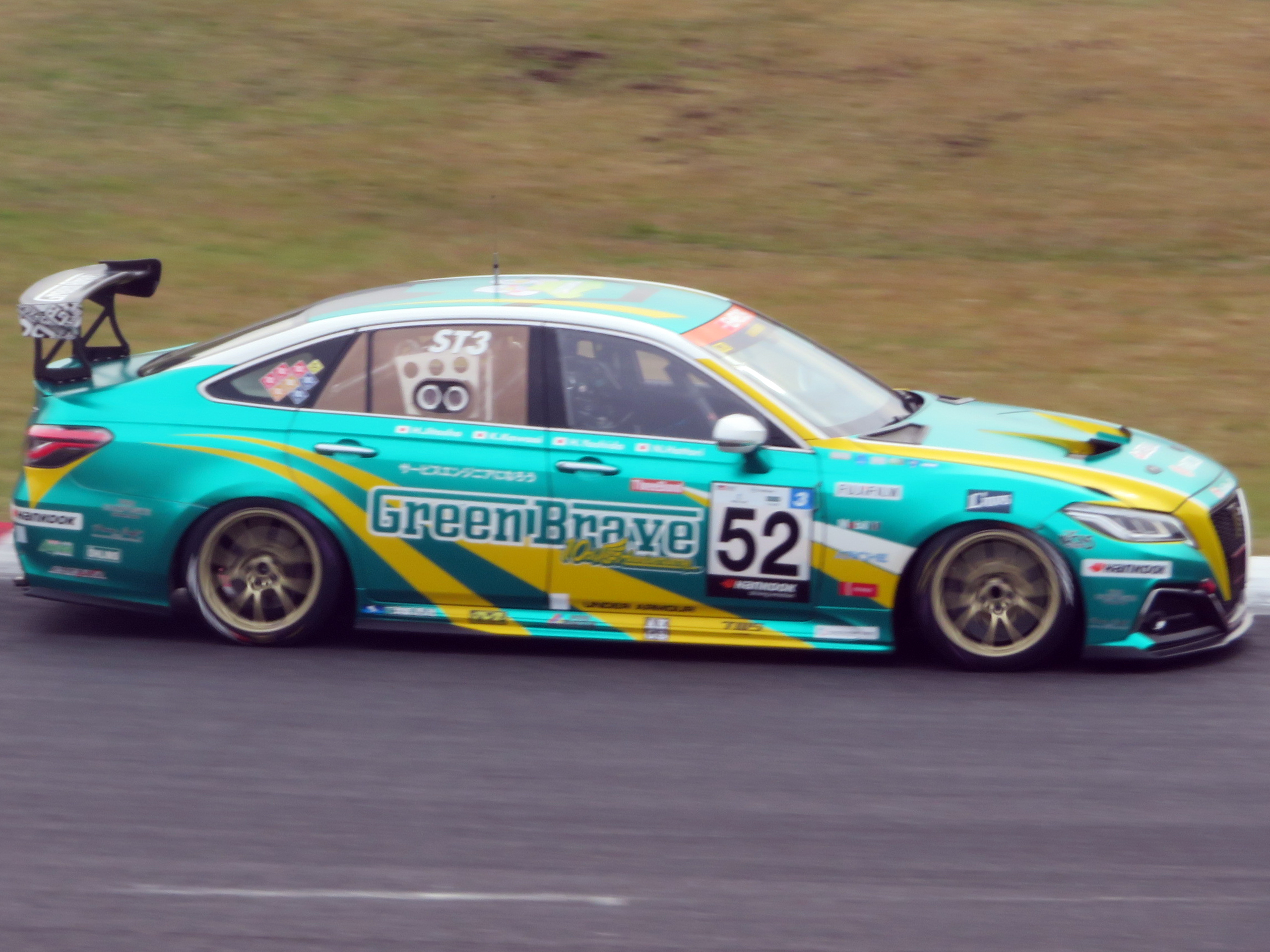
Crown ST-3 race car at the 2022 Suzuka 5 Hours

Toyota entered motorsport in 1957. Toyota entered the first Japanese car in an overseas rally championship with the Crown Deluxe. The car's completion of the 5th Round Australia, which was held from August 21st to September 8th 1957, marked the beginning of Toyota's motorsport history. The 19-day race, covering 17,000 km around Australia's rough roads and tracks, was also intended to promote the company in Australia.

At 2020 Fuji 24 Hours, the S220 Crown was debuted in the ST-3 class at the Fuji 24 Hours, the opening round of the 2020 Super Taikyu season. The Crown was achieved a debut victory. The Crown was developed for competing in the ST-3 class of the S-Taikyu Series and replaced the Mark X (X130). The ST-3 class is contested by 2WD cars with engines ranging from 2000cc to 3500cc.

== Sales ==
Year	Japan		United States		China		
Year	Crown Series	Crown Crossover	Crown Crossover	Crown Signia	Crown (sedan)	Crown SportCross	Crown series
1992	155,744						
1993	117,673						
1994	113,859						
1995	130,068						
1996	137,676						
1997	109,711						
1998	73,948						
1999	87,253						
2000	101,000						
2001	82,901						
2002	68,798						
2003	56,089						
2004	116,614						
2005	79,546						28,260
2006	70,833						42,488
2007	56,455						53,111
2008	74,904						45,427
2009	40,216						32,856
2010	40,529						45,161
2011	29,927						30,321
2012	29,963						25,456
2013	82,701						23,315
2014	49,166						14,880
2015	44,316						26,017
2016	39,813						30,251
2017	29,085						37,455
2018	50,324						36,338
2019	36,125						10,378
2020	22,173						1,927
2021	21,411						4,061
2022	17,767	9,147					
2023	43,029	38,721	19,063		—	371	
2024	62,628	16,200	19,648	10,263	30	945	
2025			12,309	20,550	1,078	112	
