= 09 =

09 may refer to:

- The year 2009, or any year ending with 09, which may be written as '09
- September, the ninth month
- 9 (number)
- Ariège (department) (postal code), a French department
- Auckland, New Zealand, which has the telephone area code 09
- 09 (film), 2021 Kurdish crime thriller film directed by Bakhtyat Fatah
- Lynk & Co 09, a mid-size luxury crossover SUV

== See also ==
- O9 (disambiguation)
- 9 (disambiguation)
