= Volvo V =

Volvo V may refer to:

- Volvo V40, a car model from the Swedish car manufacturer Volvo
- Volvo V50, a car model from the Swedish car manufacturer Volvo
- Volvo V60, a car model from the Swedish car manufacturer Volvo
- Volvo V70, a car model from the Swedish car manufacturer Volvo
- Volvo V90, a car model from the Swedish car manufacturer Volvo
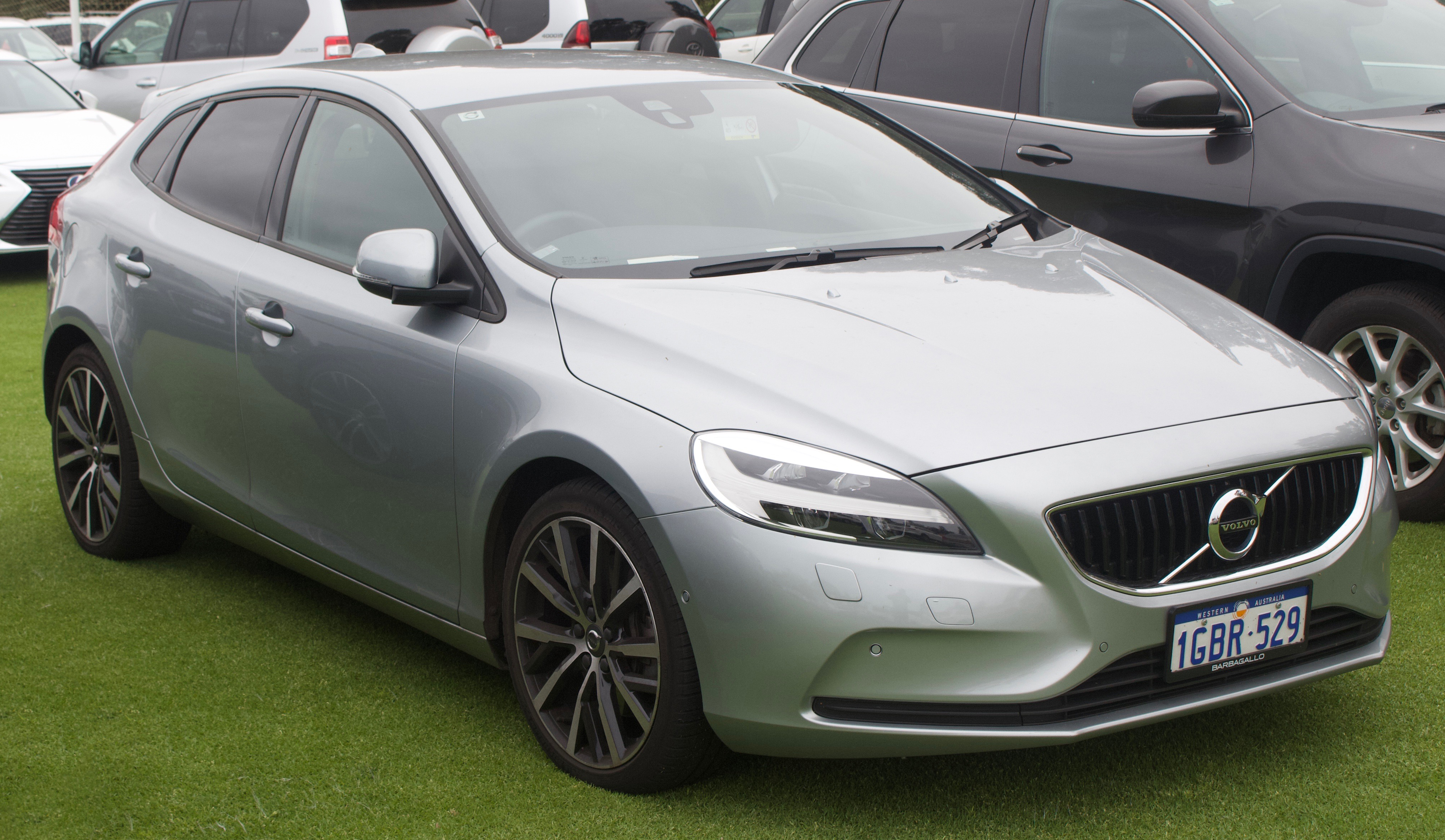
Volvo V40

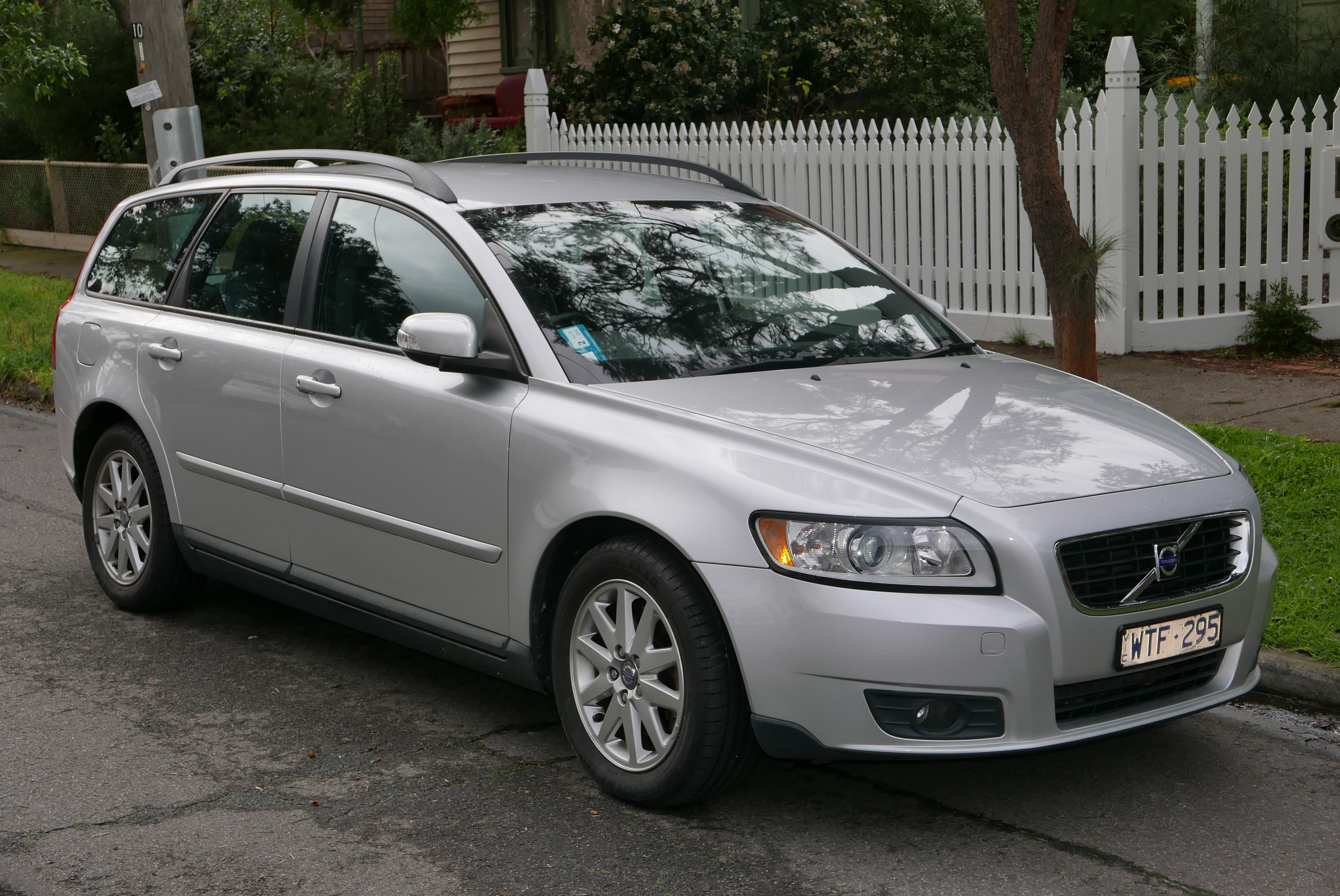
Volvo V50

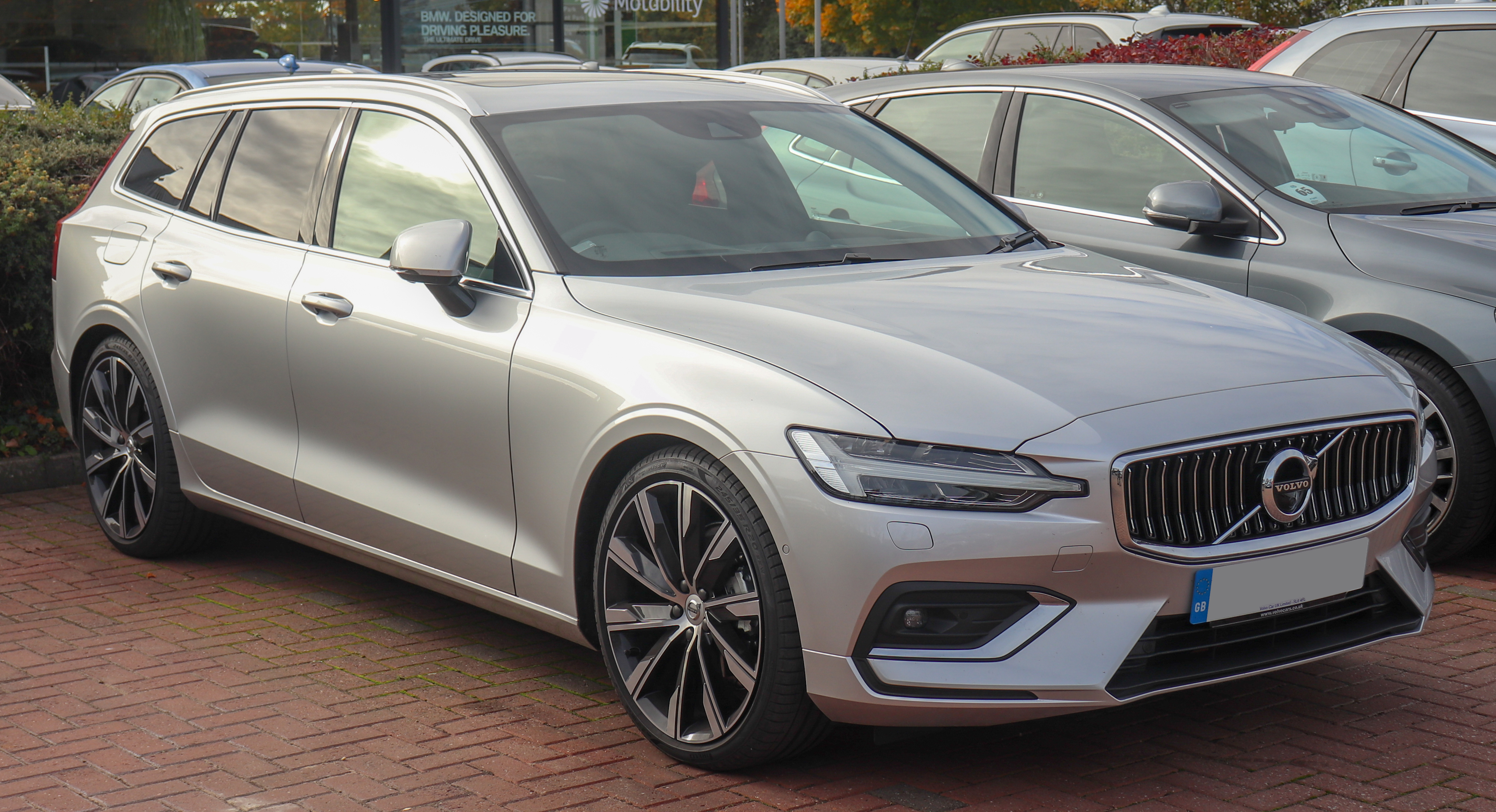
Volvo V60

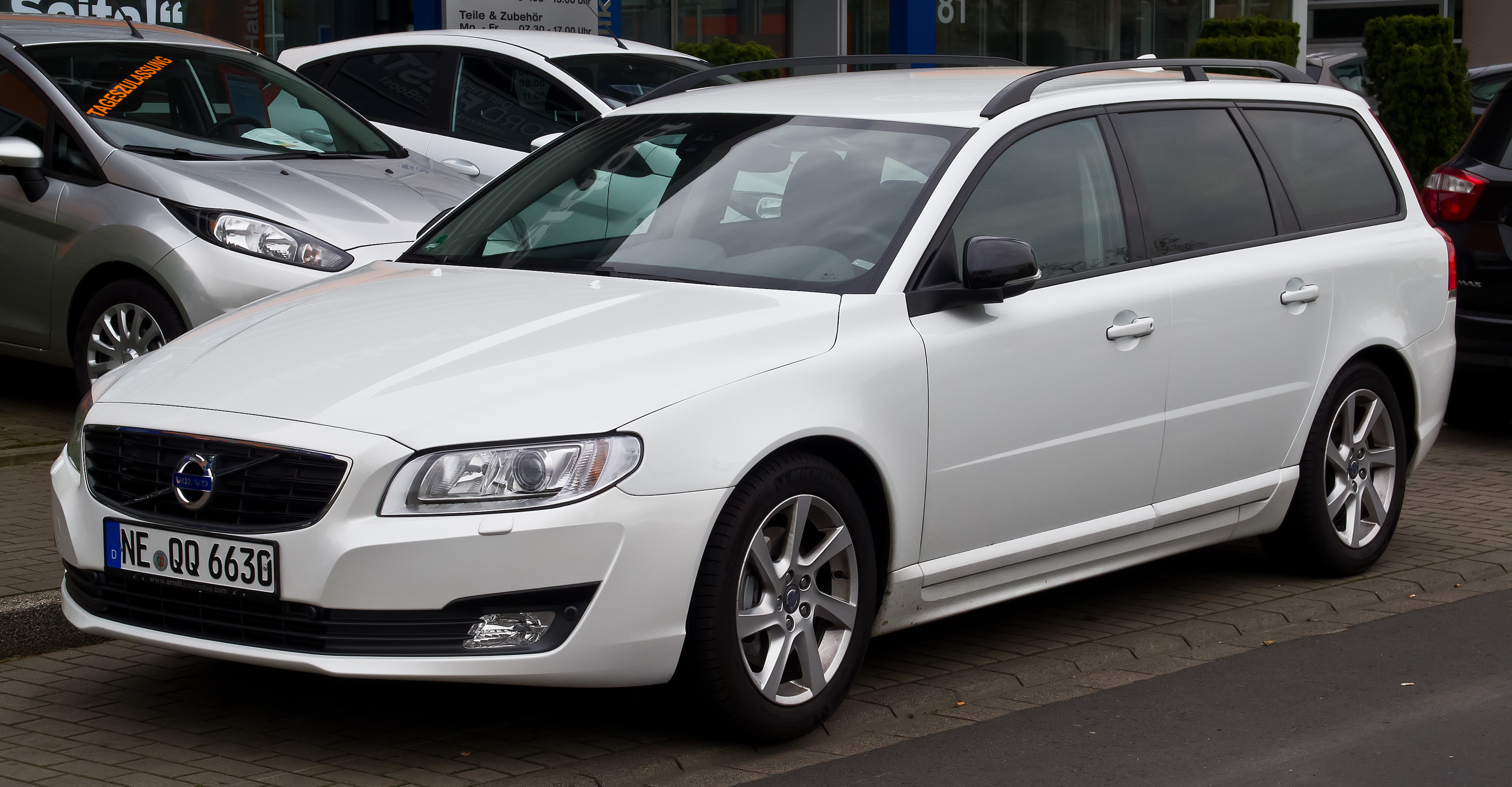
Volvo V70

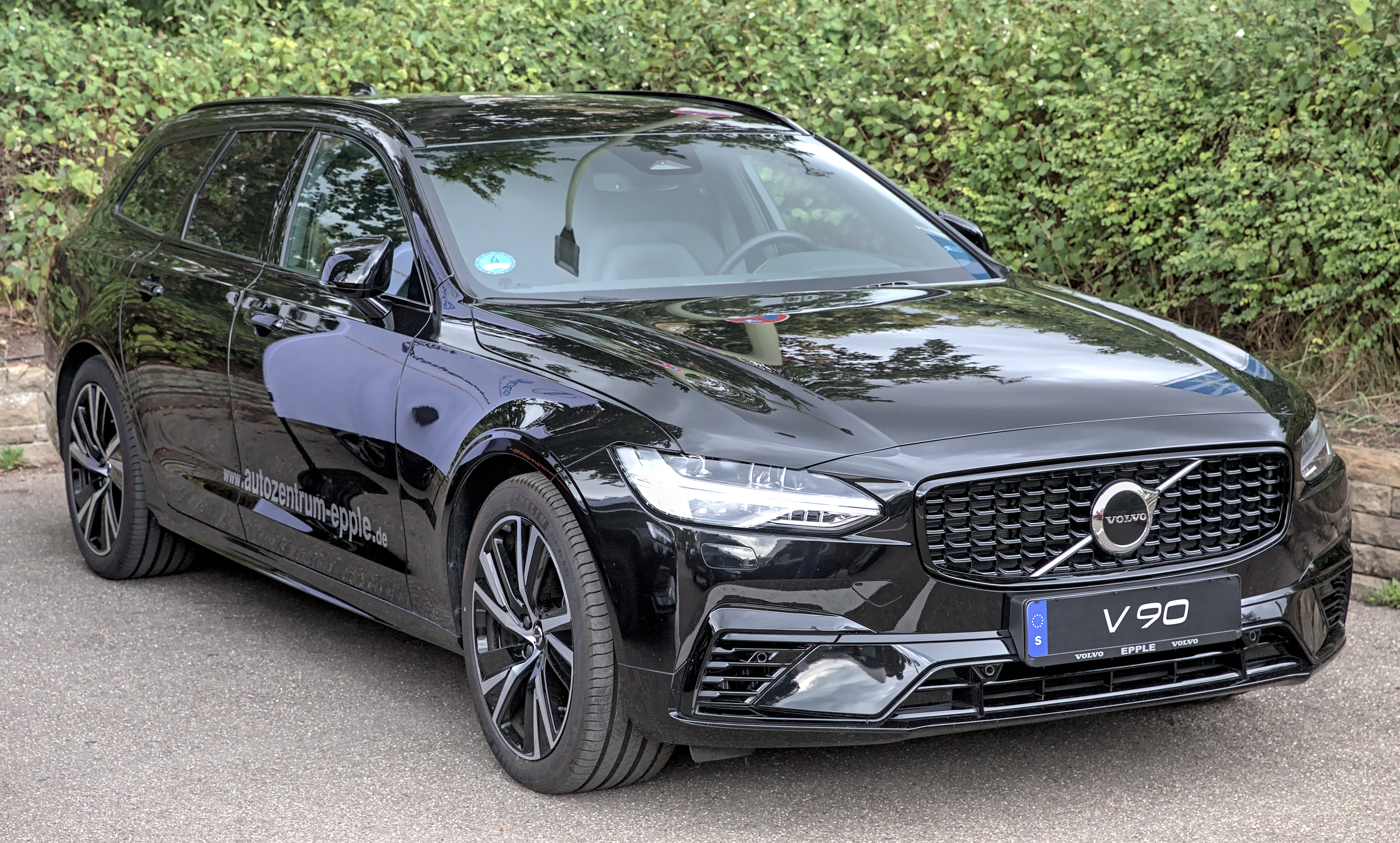
Volvo V90
