= Lynk & Co 09 =

Mid-size luxury crossover SUV

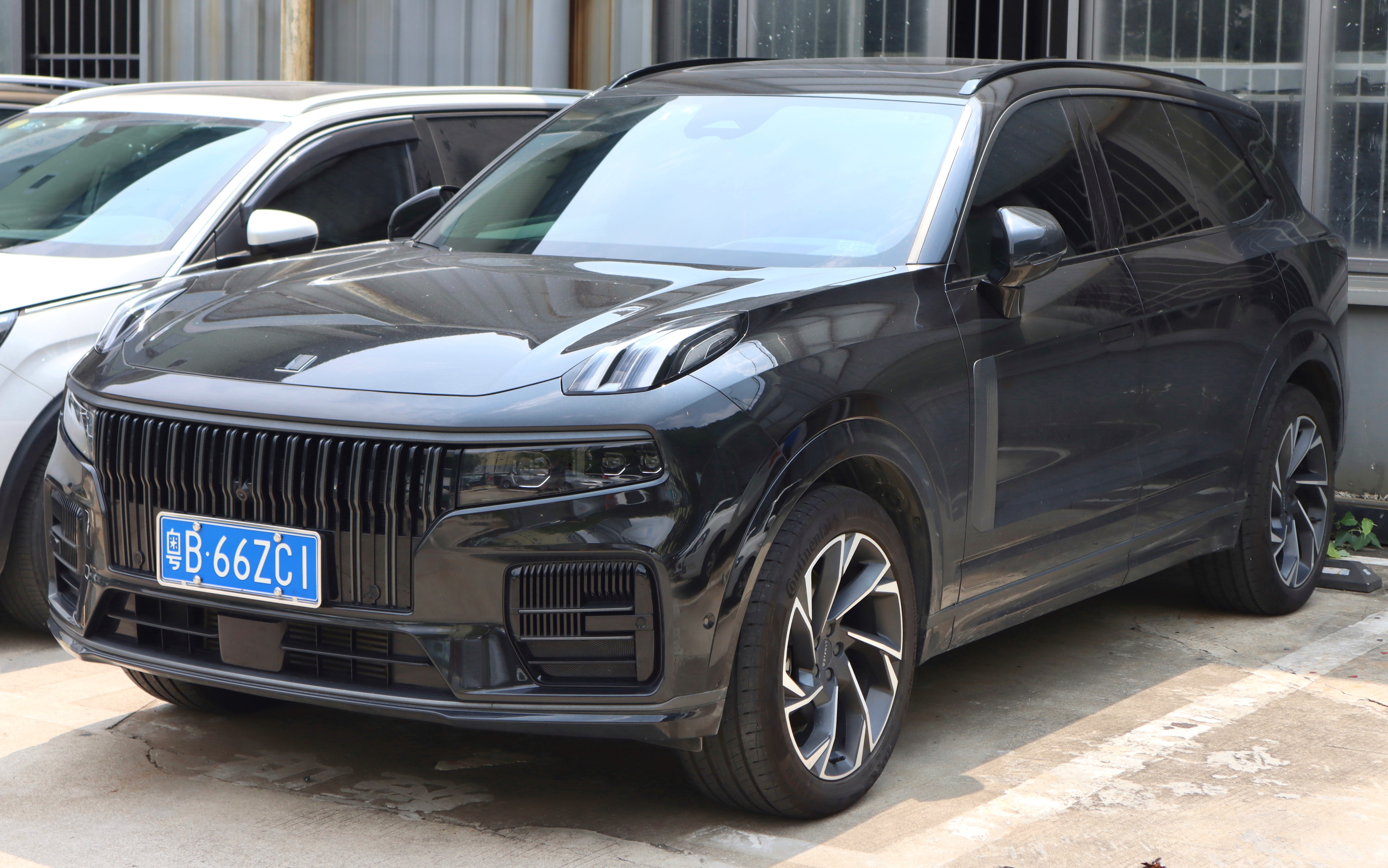

Overview
- Manufacturer: Lynk & Co (Geely)
- Model code: EX11
- Also called: Nordcross 001 (Russia)
- Production: September 2021 – present
- Model years: 2021–present
- Assembly: China: Ningbo, Zhejiang (Meishu plant)
- Designer: Jon Rådbrink; Lars Falk

Body and chassis
- Class: Mid-size luxury crossover SUV
- Body style: 5-door SUV
- Platform: SPA platform
- Related: Volvo XC90 II; Volvo S90 II

Powertrain
- Engine: 2.0 L B4204T18 Drive-E turbocharged mild hybrid I4; 2.0 L B4204T18 Drive-E twincharged hybrid I4; 2.0 L B4204T35 Drive-E twincharged PHEV I4
- Electric motor: 14 PS (10 kW; 14 hp) B-ISG (MHEV); 87 PS (64 kW; 86 hp) / 177 PS (130 kW; 175 hp) Permanent Magnet Synchronous Motors (T8 Twin Engine); 3x Permanent Magnet Synchronous Motors (Total power: 388 PS (285 kW; 383 hp))
- Power output: 254 PS (187 kW; 251 hp) (MHEV); 431 PS (317 kW; 425 hp) (PHEV); 519 PS (382 kW; 512 hp) (09 EM-P Voyage Edition)
- Transmission: 8-speed Aisin AW TG-81SC Geartronic™ automatic; 3-speed DHT Pro
- Hybrid drivetrain: MHEV; FHEV; Plug-in hybrid
- Battery: 48V Li-ion traction battery (MHEV); 18.8 kWh (68 MJ) lithium-ion battery (PHEV); 40.1 kWh (144 MJ) lithium-ion battery (Voyage Edition)

Dimensions
- Wheelbase: 2,984 mm (117.5 in)
- Length: 5,042 mm (198.5 in)
- Width: 1,977 mm (77.8 in)
- Height: 1,780 mm (70.1 in)

The Lynk & Co 09 (Chinese: 领克09; pinyin: Lǐng kè 09) is a mid-size luxury crossover SUV manufactured by Geely-owned Chinese-Swedish automaker Lynk & Co. The model has been developed in conjunction with Volvo Cars and shares the SPA platform of the second generation Volvo XC90, both companies owned by Geely.

== Overview ==
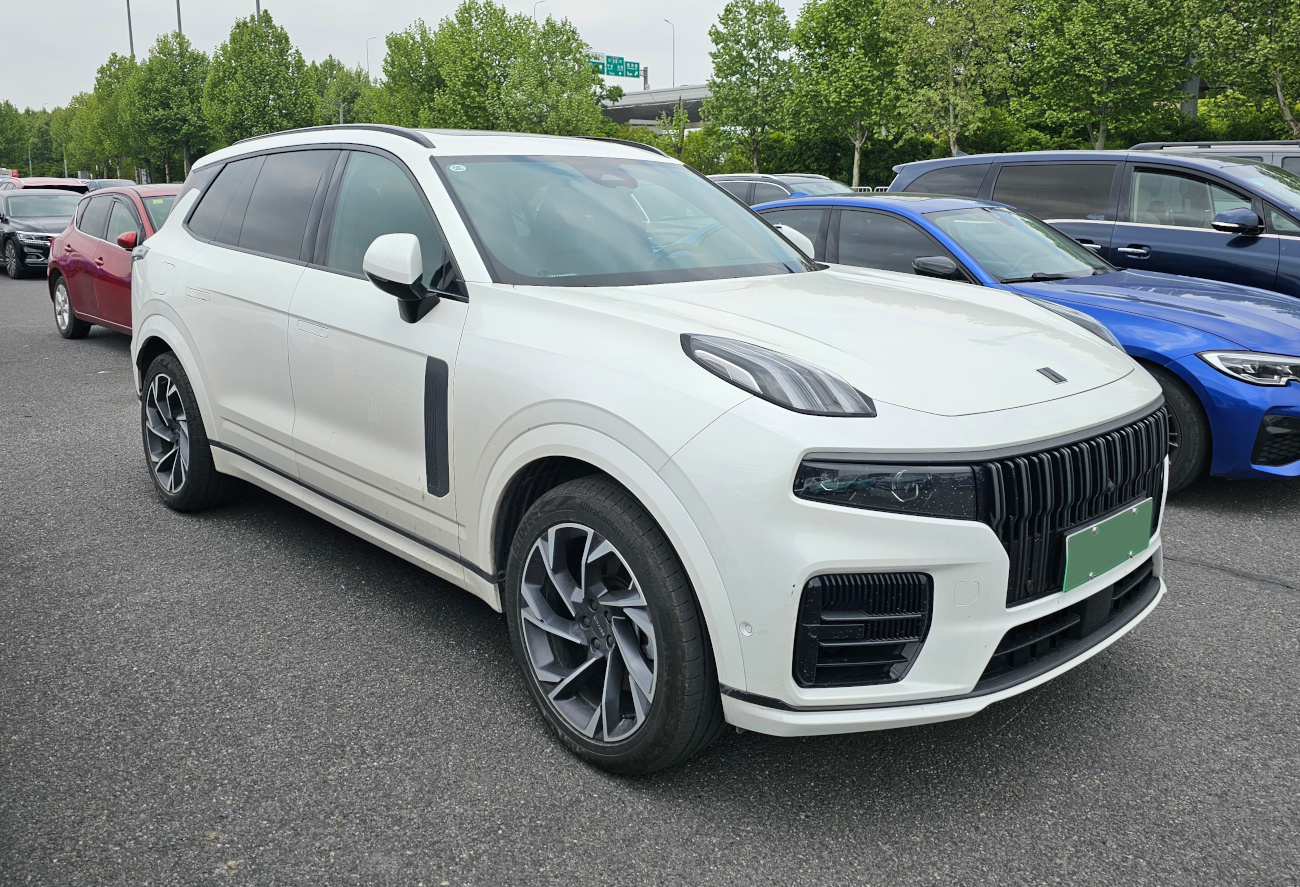
Lynk & Co 09 PHEV front

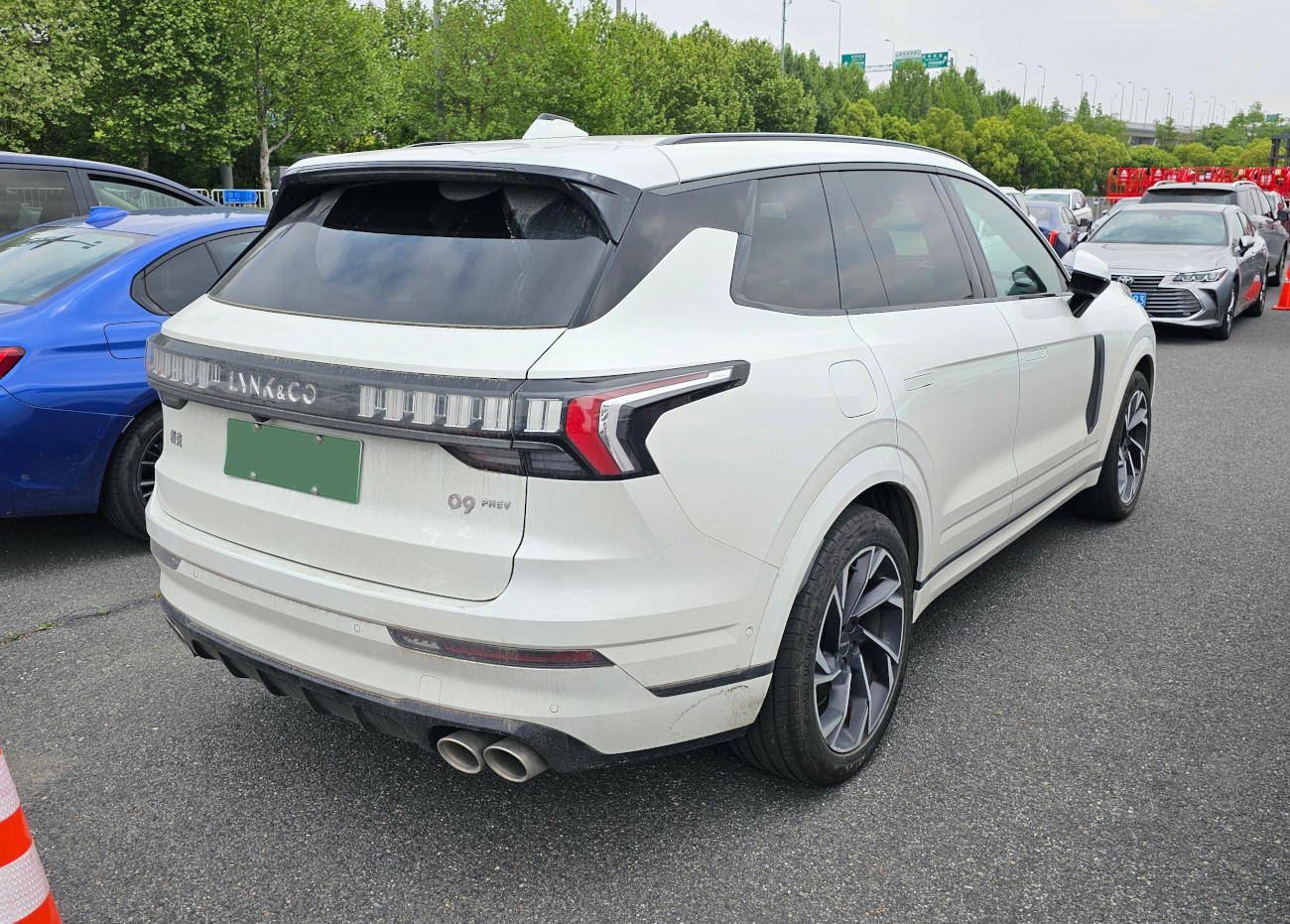
Lynk & Co 09 PHEV rear

The Lynk & Co 09 was unveiled on the 19 June 2021 in Shanghai, positioned as a mid-size SUV. The 09 is manufactured in the Meishu plant in Ningbo, China.

== Interior ==
The interior of the 09 has six LCD screens, including a 12-inch (300 mm) and 6-inch (150 mm) control panel screen, a 12.8-inch (330 mm) infotainment screen and a 12.3-inch (310 mm) panel screen. Customers will get an option to configure the 09 with six or seven seats. The top of the trim configuration of the Lynk & Co 09 is equipped with 12-way power front seats, wireless smartphone charger, AR navigation, active noise reduction system, Nappa leather upholstery, and an aromatherapy system with three modes. The package also offers Level 2 and Level 3 autonomous driving functions providing High-speed Automatic Lane Change, automatic parking, and low-speed congestion pilot function.

== Powertrain ==
Three powertrain setups are available. A mild hybrid with a 2.0 liter turbo engine mated to an Aisin 8-speed automatic gearbox and recuperation with a 48 volt battery. A hybrid with an electric motor to assist the petrol engine, with a battery that can be charged only by regeneration when breaking and by the ICE (internal combustion) engine. A PHEV (plug-in hybrid electric vehicle) with an engine and battery that can be charged by plugging it into the charging port. The powertrains develop 252 to 431 hp (188 to 321 kW; 255 to 437 PS) based on configuration with another 177 PS (130 kW; 175 hp) coming from rear electric motors, and all variants are four-wheel drive with BorgWarner supplying the AWD system.

== Sales ==
Year	China	
Year	09	PHEV
2021	2,153	1,160
2022	9,878	14,200
2023	2,946	9,712
2024	7,690	10,458
2025	8,686	4,319
