= Oix =

Oix, OIX, or variation, may refer to:

- Open Identity Exchange (OIX), advertising and digital identity provider
- oix, a syllabic encoding from Phofsit Daibuun
- Oix, a Spanish river originating in La Vall de Bianya
- Oix, Girona, a former village merged into Montagut i Oix
- Oix, a former name of the municipality of Château-d'Œx
- L'Oix, a former name of the island and commune of Loix
- Oregon-IX (OIX), an internet exchange; see List of Internet exchange points
- Orion-X (ICAO airline code: OIX), a Russian airline; see List of airlines of Russia

== See also ==
- OLX (disambiguation)
- O9 (disambiguation)
