= Polestar 7 =

Upcoming electric SUV

Overview
- Manufacturer: Polestar
- Production: 2028 (to commence)
- Assembly: Slovakia: Košice (Volvo Cars)
- Designer: Nahum Escobedo

Body and chassis
- Class: Compact luxury SUV
- Body style: 5-door SUV
- Platform: Volvo SPA3
- Related: Volvo EX60

Powertrain
- Electric motor: Likely dual-motor AWD / single-motor RWD variants
- Plug-in charging: Expected 800–900 V system

The Polestar 7 is an upcoming battery electric compact luxury SUV developed by Polestar, a Swedish electric-vehicle manufacturer jointly owned by Volvo Cars and Geely. The model is scheduled for launch in 2028 and will be produced in Europe.

== Development and production ==
Polestar confirmed in 2025 that the Polestar 7 will be manufactured at Volvo Cars' new facility in Košice, Slovakia, marking the brand's first European-built model.

The company has signed a memorandum of understanding with Volvo Cars covering joint development and production of the vehicle. Construction of the Košice plant began in 2023, with full production capacity planned before 2030.

== Platform and technology ==
The Polestar 7 will utilise a shared technology base within the Volvo–Geely group, incorporating advances such as cell-to-body battery integration, mega-casting, and next-generation electric motors.

While Polestar has not yet released specifications for powertrain, range, or battery size, it has stated that the 7 will employ the group's next-generation modular EV architecture.

== Design and naming ==
Polestar has described the 7 as a "premium compact SUV", positioned below the Polestar 3 and 4. It follows the company's numerical naming convention, succeeding the Polestar 6 sports car in the brand's model line-up.

The model will feature Polestar's established minimalist Scandinavian design language.

== Expected timeline ==
- 2025 – Production location and development partnership announced.
- 2026–27 – Prototype testing expected.
- 2028 – Planned start of European production and market launch.
