= Lynk & Co 900 =

Plug-in hybrid full-size luxury crossover SUV

Overview
- Manufacturer: Lynk & Co (Zeekr)
- Model code: L946
- Production: 2025–present
- Assembly: China: Ningbo, Zhejiang
- Designer: Andrey Basmanov (Chief Exterior Designer); Akos Stegmar (Chief Interior Designer); Burcin Kesercioglu (Chief CMF Designer)

Body and chassis
- Class: Full-size luxury crossover SUV
- Body style: 5-door SUV
- Layout: Front-engine, dual-motor, all-wheel drive; Front-engine, triple-motor, all-wheel drive
- Platform: SPA Evo

Powertrain
- Engine: Petrol plug-in hybrid: 1.5 L JLM-4G15TD I4 turbo; 2.0 L JLH-4G20TDC I4 turbo
- Electric motor: Permanent magnet synchronous
- Power output: 530–630 kW (710–840 hp; 720–860 PS)
- Transmission: 3-speed DHT
- Hybrid drivetrain: Plug-in hybrid
- Battery: 44.9 kWh NMC CALB; 52.4 kWh Freevoy NMC CATL
- Range: 1,350–1,443 km (839–897 mi) (CLTC)
- Electric range: 185–220 km (115–137 mi) (WLTP); 220–280 km (140–170 mi) (CLTC)

Dimensions
- Wheelbase: 3,160 mm (124.4 in)
- Length: 5,240 mm (206.3 in)
- Width: 1,999 mm (78.7 in)
- Height: 1,810 mm (71.3 in)
- Curb weight: 2,660–2,820 kg (5,860–6,220 lb)

The Lynk & Co 900 (Chinese: 领克900; pinyin: Lǐng kè 900; pronounced "nine zero zero" in English or "jiu ling ling" in Chinese, not "nine hundred") is a plug-in hybrid three-row six-seater full-size luxury crossover SUV marketed by Lynk & Co since 2025. It is the brand's largest vehicle, and is the first production vehicle to use an NVIDIA Thor SoC.

== Overview ==
Rear view

The Lynk & Co 900 was first unveiled on 3 January 2025 with further details revealed on 12 March 2025, with pre-orders opening later that month on March 25 with deliveries beginning in late April. It has a starting price of 330,000 yuan (45,500 USD). Sales officially began on April 28, 2025.

Built on the SPA Evo architecture, an updated version of Volvo's Scalable Product Architecture platform, the vehicle is positioned as a six-seater flagship SUV. It features the "urban opposite aesthetic" design language from the brand.

The front design integrates a headlight group and grille in parallel lines, maintaining Lynk & Co's design language. Its lighting system utilises 10,192 LED lamp units with customizable light scenes that allows for welcoming, driving, and parking modes, along with additional features like customizable messages and animations. The SUV has a short front overhang, allowing for a 20 degree approach angle for better off-road capabilities. It has a drag coefficient of 0.291 C_{d}. It has 20- and 21-inch wheel options, and is available in a choice of five paint colors: Polar Night Black, Sunlight Silver, Morning Dawn Blue, Cloudy Grey, and Dawn White.

In the interior, the Lynk & Co 900 is equipped with a 30-inch 6K 32:10 aspect ratio touchscreen that spans from the center to the passenger side of the dashboard, which is used for infotainment, controls, passenger entertainment, supports split-screen functionality, and is powered by a Qualcomm Snapdragon 8295 SoC. Other features include a dashboard-integrated 12.66-inch digital instrument panel supplemented by a 95-inch AR head-up display, two 50W wireless charging pads on the center console, and a 30-inch folding ceiling-mounted rear passenger entertainment screen with its own dedicated Snapdragon 8295 SoC. It has a standard 23-speaker sound system, with an optional 31-speaker Harmon Kardon system which features two speakers built into each headrest of the first and second row seats. It is also equipped with ambient lighting that provides 256 RGB gradient effects that synchronize with music rhythm.

The interior materials used are a combination of metallic pearlescent fabrics, faux suede, and Nappa leather, with details such as translucent vacuum-plated trims creating a crystal-like texture. It is available in three color options: Sunlight Beige, Crimson Sunset Orange, and Starry Night Blue. All seats have heating and massaging functions, while the first two rows also have ventilation functions. Space optimization allows for a 6.16 m^{2} (66.3 sq ft) interior with adjustable seating for all rows. The second-row seats can be adjusted forward and backwards by 550 mm (22 in) and rotate 90° towards the door or 180° to face rearwards. The second row has access to folding tables built into the front seatbacks and full-length doors capable of opening to nearly 90 degrees. The rear of the center console contains a temperature controlled 9-litre (0.32 cu ft) compartment which can keep items between −6–50 °C (21–122 °F). Each of the two sunroofs has a power sunshade, and the rear windows all have manual sunshades. The third row seats can be adjusted forward and backward by 125 mm (4.9 in). The trunk offers up to 300 L (10.6 cu ft) of space and a 20 L (0.71 cu ft) underfloor compartment, expanding to 1,070 L (37.8 cu ft) with the third row folded down. The rear cargo opening has a split-tailgate design, and the lower tailgate can support up to 300 kg (660 lb) and has an optional chair accessory package.

The 900 is equipped with dual-chamber air suspension with continuous damping control. The air suspension is capable of dynamically switching to a single-chamber mode when necessary to reduce body roll. It has a turning radius of 6.15 metres (20.2 ft), which is reduced to 4.98 metres (16.3 ft) when equipped with the rear-wheel steering system found on the top trim, which is also makes the 900 capable of crab walking and turning in place.

The 900 is the first production vehicle to feature the NVIDIA Drive Thor SoC, which is capable of 700 TOPS of computational power; lower trims are equipped with a NVIDIA Drive Orin-X SoC, capable of 254 TOPS. It collects data from a sensor suite including one 126-line RoboSense LiDAR sensor, five mmWave radars, 11 cameras, and 12 ultrasonic sensors. It powers the vehicle's Qianli Haohan driver assistance system, which includes a supervised autonomous driving system called G-Pilot H7 capable of operating on urban streets without the assistance of high-resolution map data. It is also able to navigate around traffic congestion on highways. Lower trim levels using Orin chips are equipped with the G-Pilot H5 system.

The 900 was shown to be able to maintain crash safety for third row passengers, an area that current NCAP crash test programs do not cover. In a custom crash test shown publicly on CCTV, the vehicle was subjected to two consecutive 100 km/h (62 mph) impacts, the first being a moderate overlap collision to the rear followed by a side impact collision centered on the third row seats. For comparison, contemporary C-NCAP testing uses 80 km/h (50 mph) rear-end collisions and 50 km/h (31 mph) side impact collisions centered on the second row, with Euro NCAP standards having similar tests with lighter weights. The CAERI certified that there was sufficiently low cabin intrusions, and that there was no fire risk. Lynk & Co says that the good crash test performance was in part due to the use of the SPA Evo platform, which was co-engineered with Volvo.

== Powertrain ==
The 900 comes in three EM-p plug-in hybrid all-wheel drive powertrain options using silicon carbide power electronics.

The 530 kW (710 hp; 720 PS) entry model uses a 143 kW (192 hp; 194 PS) 1.5-liter turbocharged inline-four cylinder petrol engine paired with a 160 kW (210 hp; 220 PS) motor mounted between the engine and transmission, along with a 230 kW (310 hp; 310 PS) motor independently driving the rear wheels. Power is supplied by a 43.3 kWh NMC battery, providing an electric range of 220 km (137 mi) on the CLTC cycle.

The 540 kW (720 hp; 730 PS) middle-tier powertrain uses a 187 kW (251 hp; 254 PS) 2.0-liter turbocharged inline-four cylinder petrol engine paired with a 123 kW (165 hp; 167 PS) motor mounted to the transmission, along with the same 230 kW (310 hp; 310 PS) motor driving the rear wheels. Power is supplied by a 52.4 kWh pack using CATL's Freevoy NMC-Sodium-ion hybrid chemistry technology, providing an electric range of 280 km (174 mi). The battery is capable of a 4C charge rate when DC fast charging, allowing for a 20-80% charge time of 17 minutes.

The Freevoy battery technology allows for the use of both traditional NMC cells and sodium-ion cells to combine each chemistry's advantages. The use sodium-ion cells results in improved cold weather performance while maintaining the superior energy density of conventional NMC-only packs, increasing cold temperature range by 5% and allowing the pack to discharge in ambient temperatures as low −40 °C (−40 °F), charge at −30 °C (−22 °F), and operate normally at −20 °C (−4 °F).

The 650 kW (870 hp; 880 PS) top powertrain uses the same engine, front motor, and battery but replaces the single rear motor with two 160 kW (210 hp; 220 PS) motors. It has a 0–100 km/h (62 mph) acceleration time under 5 seconds and a top speed over 200 km/h (120 mph).

Model	Battery	Power				Torque	Range			20‍–‍80% DCFC time	0–100 km/h (62 mph) time	Top speed	Kerb weight
Model	Battery	Engine	Front	Rear	Total		Electric (CLTC)	Electric (WLTP)	Total (CLTC)	20‍–‍80% DCFC time	0–100 km/h (62 mph) time	Top speed	Kerb weight
1.5 L dual motor	44.85 kWh NMC CALB	1499 cc I4 turbo 143 kW (192 hp; 194 PS) @5500 rpm	160 kW (210 hp; 220 PS)	230 kW (310 hp; 310 PS)	530 kW (710 hp; 720 PS)	1,000 N⋅m (740 lb⋅ft)	220 km (140 mi)	185 km (115 mi)	1,355 km (842 mi)	26 min	4.8 s	210 km/h (130 mph)	2,660–2,760 kg (5,860–6,080 lb)
2.0 L dual motor	52.38 kWh Freevoy NMC/Sodium-ion CATL	1969 cc I4 turbo 187 kW (251 hp; 254 PS) @5500 rpm	123 kW (165 hp; 167 PS)	230 kW (310 hp; 310 PS)	540 kW (720 hp; 730 PS)	1,038 N⋅m (766 lb⋅ft)	280 km (170 mi)	220 km (140 mi)	1,350 km (840 mi)	17 min	4.6 s	240 km/h (150 mph)	2,810 kg (6,190 lb)
2.0 L triple motor	52.38 kWh Freevoy NMC/Sodium-ion CATL	1969 cc I4 turbo 187 kW (251 hp; 254 PS) @5500 rpm	123 kW (165 hp; 167 PS)	2×160 kW (210 hp; 220 PS)	650 kW (870 hp; 880 PS)	1,248 N⋅m (920 lb⋅ft)	268 km (167 mi)	—	1,443 km (897 mi)	17 min	4.3 s	240 km/h (150 mph)	2,820 kg (6,220 lb)

== Lynk & Co 900L (2026) ==
Lynk & Co 900L

Overview
- Production: 2026 (to commence)
- Assembly: China: Ningbo, Zhejiang

Powertrain
- Hybrid drivetrain: Plug-in hybrid

Dimensions
- Wheelbase: 3,170 mm (124.8 in)
- Length: 5,280 mm (207.9 in)
- Width: 1,999 mm (78.7 in)
- Height: 1,810 mm (71.3 in)

A facelifted and slightly stretched version of the 900 known as the Lynk & Co 900L was revealed on 17 October 2026.

Compared to the 900, the 900L's exterior features multiple changes. The front fascia was completely redesigned, taking inspiration from the Time to Shine GT concept. The upper daytime running lights, split main headlights, and the display between the headlights have all been merged into a single horizontal unit, while the bumper has been completely reshaped with added chrome accents. Semi-hidden door handles also replace the previously fully hidden units.

== Sales ==
After pre-orders opened on 25 March 2025, the 900 received over 8,200 orders within one hour. After sales began on 28 April 2025, the 900 received over 10,000 firm orders within one hour, and exceeded 30,000 orders 20 days later on May 17.

Year	China
2025	44,347
