= OLX (disambiguation) =

OLX may refer to:

- OLX (OnLine eXchange; Olx), former Dutch-dominicled international online marketplace
  - OLX Group, former company of the OLX On-Line eXchange
- OLX (radio station), a station operated by the UZSI, the Czech foreign intelligence service Office for Foreign Relations and Information
- OLX (song), a track on the 1997 album The Conet Project
- UK R AF No. 220 Squadron RAF (callsign: OLX), see List of RAF squadron codes
- Olkiombo Airstrip (IATA airporte code: OLX), see List of airports by IATA airport code: O
- Olimex Aerotaxi (ICAO airline code: OLX), see List of airline codes (O)
- Ostseeland Express (OLX), a rail service operated by Transdev Germanyx

== See also ==
- oix (disambiguation)
