= 9O =

9O or 9-O may refer to:

- 9O, IATA code for National Airways Cameroon
- 9°, an abbreviation for ninth in some languages
  - Grêmio Atlético do 9° Regimento; see Grêmio Atlético Farroupilha
- 9O–9T, the ITU prefix codes for Democratic Republic of the Congo
- 9O, squadron code for No. 44 Maintenance Unit; see List of RAF Squadron Codes

== See also ==
- 9°
- O9 (disambiguation)
- 90
