= Volvo EX60 =

Battery-electric compact luxury crossover SUV

Overview
- Manufacturer: Volvo Cars
- Production: April 2026 – present
- Assembly: Sweden: Torslanda (Torslandaverken)

Body and chassis
- Class: Compact luxury crossover SUV (D)
- Body style: 5-door SUV
- Layout: Rear-motor, rear-wheel-drive; Dual-motor, all-wheel-drive
- Platform: Volvo SPA3
- Related: Polestar 7

Powertrain
- Electric motor: 1 or 2 permanent magnet synchronous motors
- Power output: 369 hp (275 kW; 374 PS) (RWD); 503–670 hp (375–500 kW; 510–679 PS) (AWD)
- Battery: RWD: 80 kWh Sunwoda NMC; AWD: 91 kWh Sunwoda NMC; 112 kWh CATL NMC
- Range: 310–400 mi (500–640 km)

Dimensions
- Wheelbase: 2,970 mm (116.9 in)
- Length: 4,803 mm (189.1 in)
- Width: 1,899 mm (74.8 in)
- Height: 1,635 mm (64.4 in)

The Volvo EX60 is a battery electric compact luxury crossover SUV manufactured and marketed by Swedish automaker Volvo Cars.

== Overview ==
The EX60 is the first Volvo built on the SPA3 platform, an evolution of the already-existing Scalable Product Architecture platform. The SPA3 platform uses megacasting to reduce production time and cost, and features cell-to-body technology which integrates the battery pack with the chassis. It also features a "Hugin Core", combining computing hardware and software developed in-house with those developed by Google, Nvidia and Qualcomm. It will be built in Torslanda and its platform will eventually underpin all Volvo models.

It is also the first Volvo to feature a standard NACS charging port, offering up to a 400 kW DC fast charger that adds an estimated 170 miles of range in 10 minutes.

Production of the EX60 began at the Torslandaverken on 22 April 2026.

Rear view

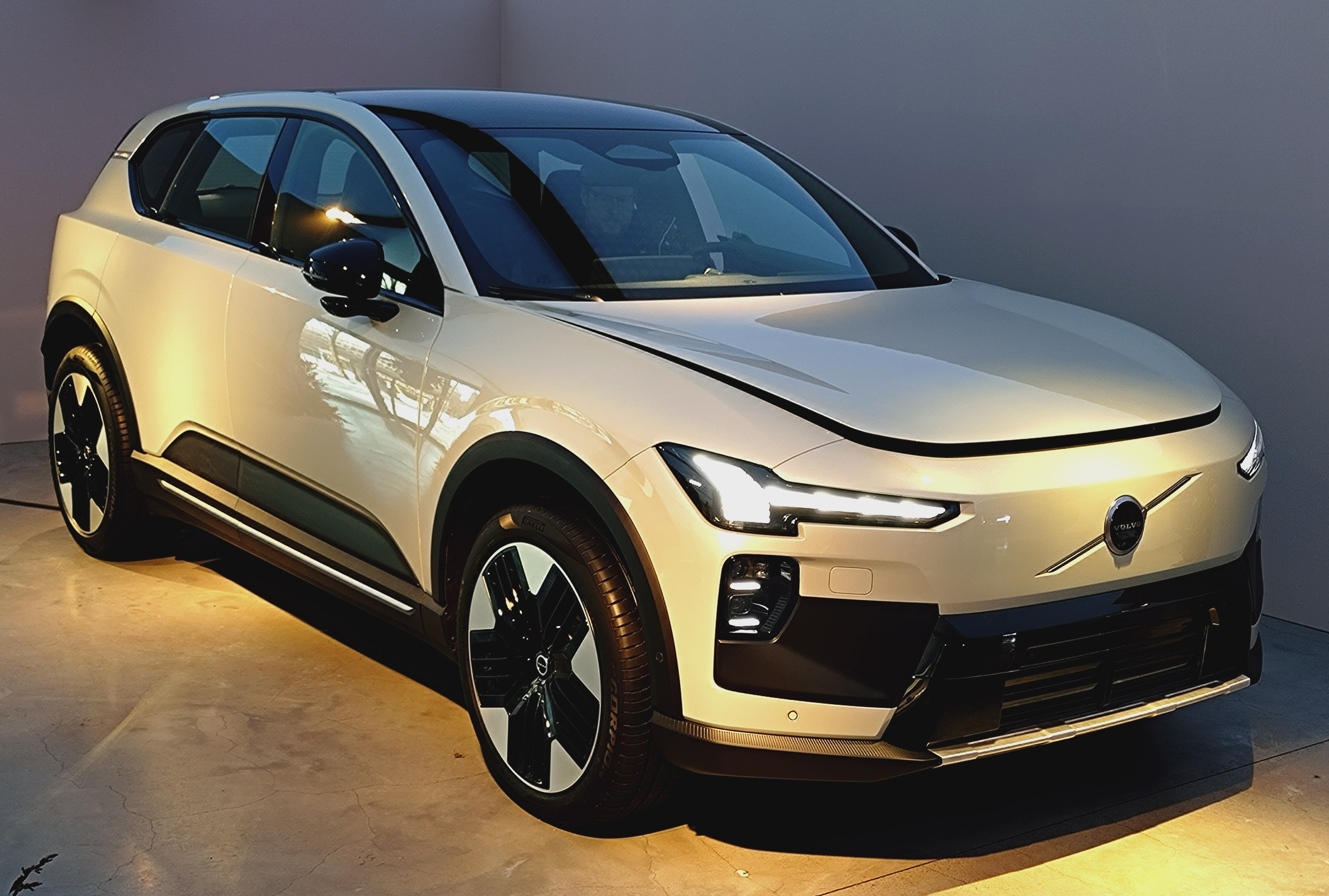
Volvo EX60 Cross Country

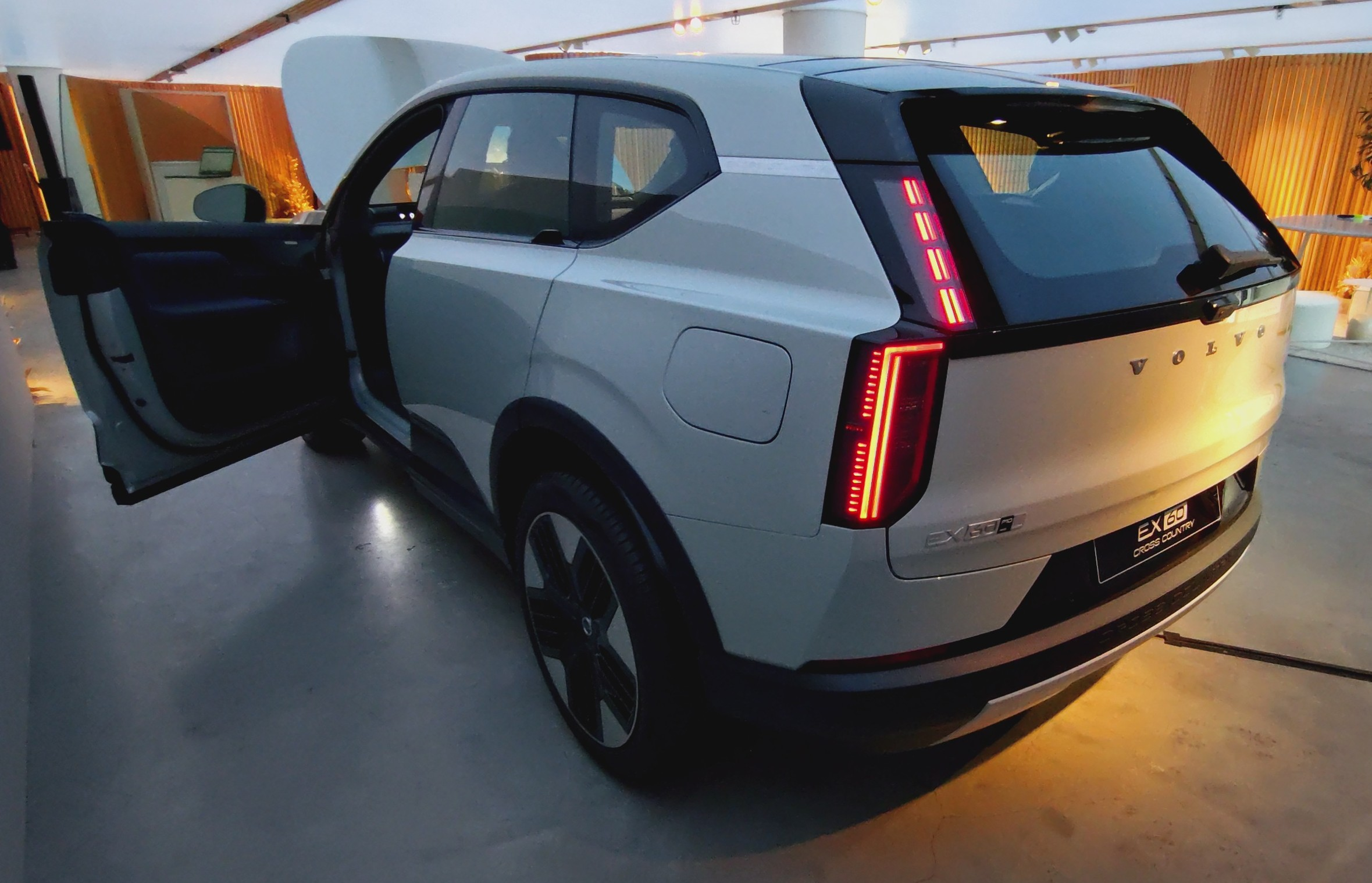
Volvo EX60 Cross Country

Interior

=== Design ===
The EX60 features design elements from other Volvo models, including the brand's "Thor's hammer" daytime running lights and vertically oriented taillights. It also features a closed front end and hidden rear wiper. A low hood, tapered body sides and sloping roofline contribute to an improved drag coefficient of 0.26. Furthermore, winglet-style door handles are also used to further improve aerodynamic efficiency.

=== Interior ===
The interior has a minimalistic design featuring sustainable materials, including a choice of leather, synthetic leather and wool. A storage bin located in center of the area below of the dashboard, replacing the typical glovebox. It also either features a 21-speaker sound system, or a 28-speaker Bowers & Wilkins unit with headrest-mounted speakers.

The EX60 debuts a new display setup not seen in other Volvo models, consisting of a thin instrument cluster mounted above the dashboard, and a 15.1-inch floating central display with a convex curve. The infotainment system is powered by Nvidia's AGX Orin platform with a Qualcomm Snapdragon 8255 CPU, and has Google Gemini built in.

The EX60 uses a frunk that allows for items to be stored at the front.

=== Cross Country ===
A Cross Country variant of the EX60 was announced simultaneously with the standard models. Compared to the standard models, it features standard all wheel drive and a default ground clearance raised by 0.8 in (20 mm); its air suspension can also be raised by an additional 0.8 in (20 mm), resulting in a combined 1.6 in (41 mm) of maximum ground clearance. Changes are also made to the exterior and interior, including distinct front and rear fascias, exclusive 21-inch wheels and extended fender flares.

== Powertrain ==
The EX60 available with 3 powertrains: The rear-wheel-drive P6, all-wheel-drive P10, and the all-wheel-drive P12. They use a 80 kWh, 91 kWh and 112 kWh battery, and offer 620 km (310 miles), 660 km (320 miles), and 810 km (400 miles) of range respectively. According to Volvo, all models are limited to a top speed of 180 km/h (112 mph) are able to charge from 10%-80% in 18-19 minutes. The rear-wheel-drive EX60 P6 produces 369 horsepower and 354 pound-feet or torque. The all-wheel-drive P10 and P12 models produce 503 horsepower and 524 pound-feet of torque and 670 horsepower and 583 pound-feet of torque respectively.

== Launch and release ==
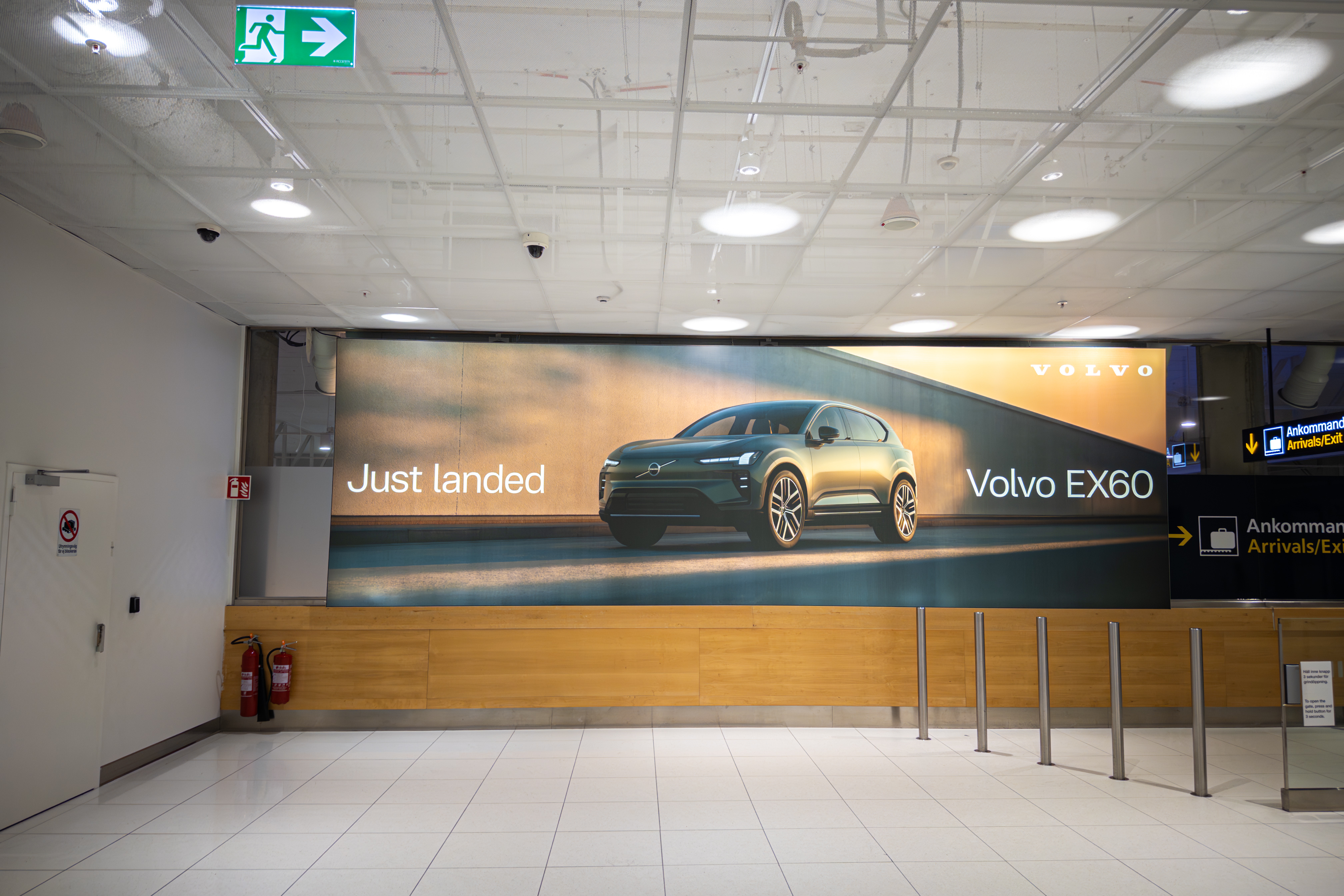
Volvo EX60 advertisement at Gothenburg Landvetter Airport

The EX60 was unveiled on 21 January 2026, at 18:00 (6:00PM) CET at Artipelag in Stockholm. The event was live-streamed on Volvo's website and YouTube channel. Images of the car were leaked on a Reddit forum a day before the official unveil.

== Markets ==
=== Australia ===
The rear-wheel-drive EX60 will go on sale in Australia in late 2026 with deliveries starting at the same time. All-wheel-drive models will arrive in Australia in 2027.

=== United States ===
The EX60 will go on sale in the United States in late spring 2026. Orders opened on 19 May 2026, with a starting MSRP of $58,400, which later becomes $59,795 when the destination is included.
