= O9 =

O9 or O-9 may refer to:

- USS O-9, an O-class submarine of the United States Navy
- O-9, the pay grade for the following senior officer ranks in the U.S. uniformed services:
  - Lieutenant General in the Army, Marine Corps, Air Force, and Space Force
  - Vice Admiral in the Navy, Coast Guard, Public Health Service Commissioned Corps, and NOAA Commissioned Officer Corps
- Douglas O-9, a variant of the Douglas O-2, a 1920s American observation aircraft
- O9 (model railways), a narrow-gauge model railway scale
- Oregon-IX (OIX), an internet exchange; see List of Internet exchange points

== See also ==
- 09 (disambiguation)
- 9O (disambiguation)
- oix (disambiguation)
