= Scalable Product Architecture platform =

Scalable Product Architecture

Overview
- Manufacturer: Volvo Cars; Polestar
- Also called: P5; Volvo P5
- Production: 2014–present (SPA); 2023–present (SPA2); 2025–present (SPA Evo); 2026–present (SPA3)
- Assembly: Volvo: Sweden: Torslanda (Torslandaverken); China: Chengdu; United States: Ridgeville, South Carolina (Volvo Car Charleston Plant)

Body and chassis
- Class: Mid-size car
- Layout: ICE engine; Front engine; front-wheel drive or four-wheel drive; Electric; Rear-motor, rear-wheel-drive or Dual-motors, four-wheel-drive
- Body styles: 2-door coupé; 4-door saloon; 5-door estate; 5-door mid-size SUV
- Vehicles: SPA: Volvo XC60 II; Volvo XC90 II; Volvo S90 II; Volvo S60; Volvo V90; Volvo V60; Polestar 1; Lynk & Co 09; SPA2: Volvo EX90; Volvo ES90; Polestar 3; SPA Evo: Lynk & Co 900; SPA3: Volvo EX60; Polestar 7
- Related: CMA platform

Powertrain
- Engines: I4; I4 hybrid; I4 diesel
- Transmissions: 6-speed Volvo M66H manual; 8-speed TF 81SG automatic

Chronology
- Predecessor: Volvo P3 platform

The Scalable Product Architecture (SPA) platform is a global, full-size, unibody automobile platform developed by Volvo Cars, and applied by multiple brands of its parent company Geely, which has been produced over three generations. It debuted in 2014 when the second-generation Volvo XC90 was released. Work on the new in-house platform began in 2011 shortly after Volvo was acquired by Geely from Ford Motor Company. During development, particular emphasis was placed on achieving weight-reduction, design commonality, manufacturing rationalization, and hybridization opportunities. The new SPA platform replaced two prior vehicle architectures, the Volvo P2 platform and Volvo P3 platform.

With SPA, Volvo claims it "enables significant improvements when it comes to offering protection in worst-case scenarios and when creating innovative features that support the driver in avoiding accidents." Volvo has invested 90 billion SEK in the platform.

All SPA based cars will be delivered with 4 cylinder engines. The diesel and petrol engines share the same Volvo Engine Architecture, and Volvo can build 530,000 engines per year.

The SPA2 platform, which is an EV-exclusive platform, debuted on the Volvo EX90 and Polestar 3 in 2023.

== Vehicles ==
SPA platform vehicles
Vehicle Name	Image	Production	Bodystyle(s)	Model Code	Notes
Volvo XC90 II		2015–present	5-door SUV	V526; 256	
Volvo S90		2017–present	4-door sedan/saloon	V541; 234	
Volvo S90L		2017–present	4-door sedan/saloon	L541; 238	
Volvo V90		2016–2025	5-door wagon/estate	V542; 235	
Volvo V90 Cross Country		2017–2025	5-door wagon/estate	V543; 236	
Volvo XC60 II		2017–present	5-door SUV	V426; 246	
Volvo S60 III		2018–2024	4-door sedan	V431; 224	
Volvo V60 II		2018–present	5-door wagon/estate	V432; 225	
Volvo V60 Cross Country		2018–present	5-door wagon/estate	V433; 227	
Polestar 1		2019–2021	2-door coupé	P514	Limited production (1,500 units)
Lynk & Co 09		2021–present	5-door SUV	EX11	
SPA2 platform vehicles
Polestar 3		2024–present	5-door SUV	P519	
Volvo EX90		2024–present	5-door SUV	V536	
Volvo ES90		2025–present	5-door Liftback	V551	
SPA3 platform vehicles
Volvo EX60		2026–present	5-door SUV		
Polestar 7		2028 (to commence)	5-door SUV		
SPA Evo platform vehicles
Lynk & Co 900		2025–present	5-door SUV	L946	
