= Volvo V90 =

Swedish executive station wagon

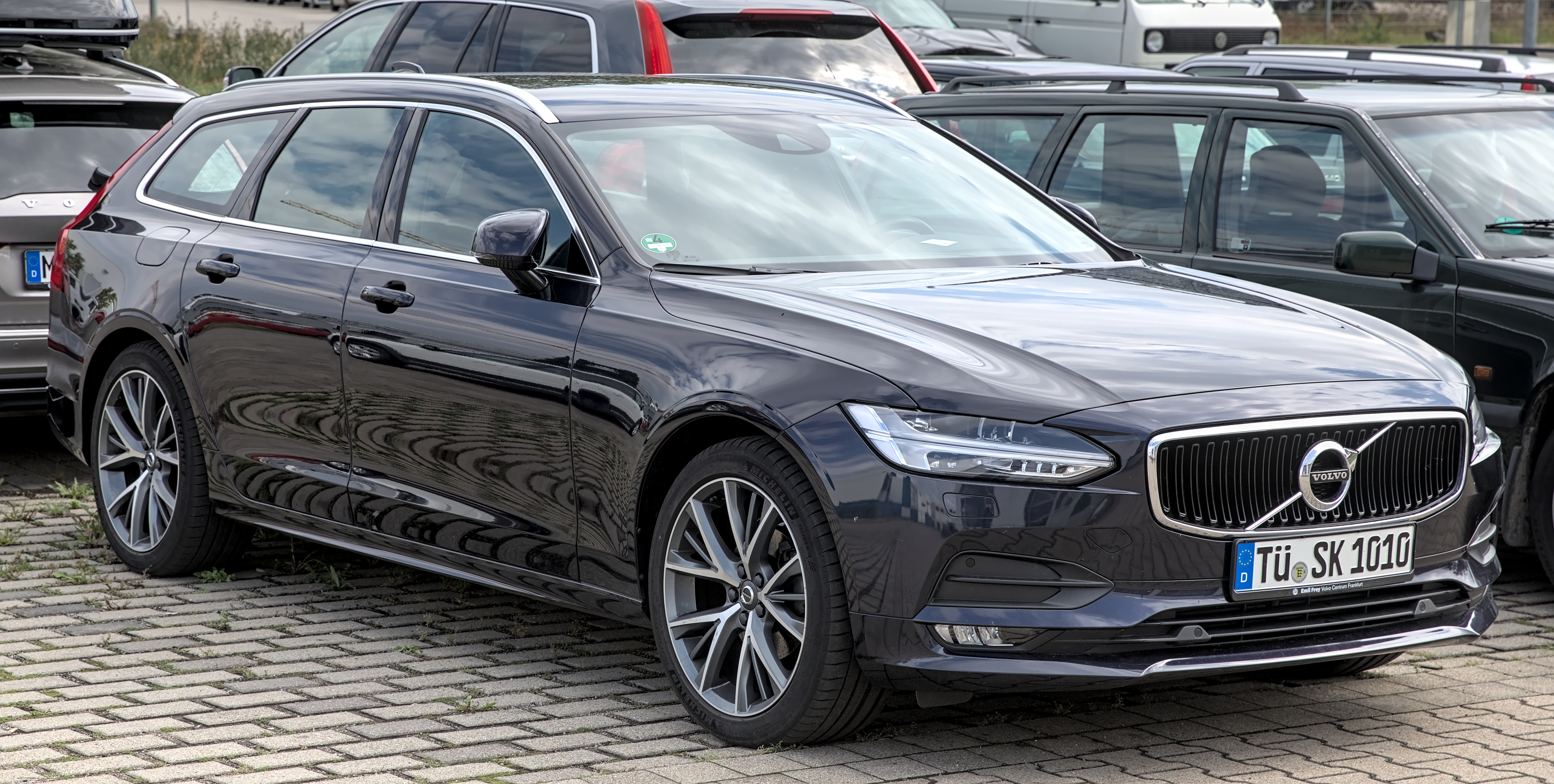
- Volvo V90

Overview
- Manufacturer: Volvo Cars
- Production: 2016–2025
- Model years: 2017–2021 (United States)
- Assembly: Sweden: Torslanda (Torslandaverken)
- Designer: Thomas Ingenlath

Body and chassis
- Class: Executive car (E)
- Body style: 5-door estate
- Layout: Front-engine, front-wheel drive or four-wheel drive
- Platform: SPA platform
- Related: Volvo S90 II; Volvo XC60 II

Powertrain
- Engine: Petrol: 2.0L I4; (140kW–235kW); Diesel: 2.0L I4; (110kW–173kW); Hybrid: 2.0L I4 petrol; (234kW–235kW + 64kW)
- Electric motor: 64 kW (87 PS) permanent magnet synchronous motors (T8 Twin Engine)
- Transmission: 8-speed Aisin TG-81SC automatic; 6-speed M66F manual
- Hybrid drivetrain: Plug-in hybrid Mild hybrid
- Battery: 9.2 kWh lithium-ion battery; 10.4 kWh lithium-ion battery
- Electric range: 45 km (28 mi) (NEDC)

Dimensions
- Wheelbase: 2,941 mm (115.8 in)
- Length: 4,936 mm (194.3 in)
- Width: 1,890 mm (74.4 in); 2,019 mm (79.5 in) with mirrors; 2,052 mm (80.8 in) with mirrors (Note: V90CC only)
- Height: V90: 1,475 mm (58.1 in); V90CC: 1,543 mm (60.7 in)
- Kerb weight: V90/V90CC: 1,825–2,100 kg (4,023–4,630 lb)

Chronology
- Predecessor: Volvo V70 / V70 XC / XC70 III

The Volvo V90 is a mid-size luxury wagon manufactured and marketed by Swedish automaker Volvo Cars from 2016 to 2025. Two months after the introduction of the sedan model, the Volvo S90, the V90 was revealed at the Geneva Motor Show in March 2016.

== Models ==
=== V90 ===
The V90 is offered with various trim levels. In the United States the V90 was only available by special order, with dealers focusing on the V90 Cross Country.

In 2021, it was announced that the V90 would no longer be sold in the United States, with 2021 being the final model year.

In 2025, the V90 was discontinued globally as Volvo shifts its focus to electric vehicles and SUVs. The very last V90 was built in October 2025, marking the end of an era for Volvo's station wagons after over six decades of production.

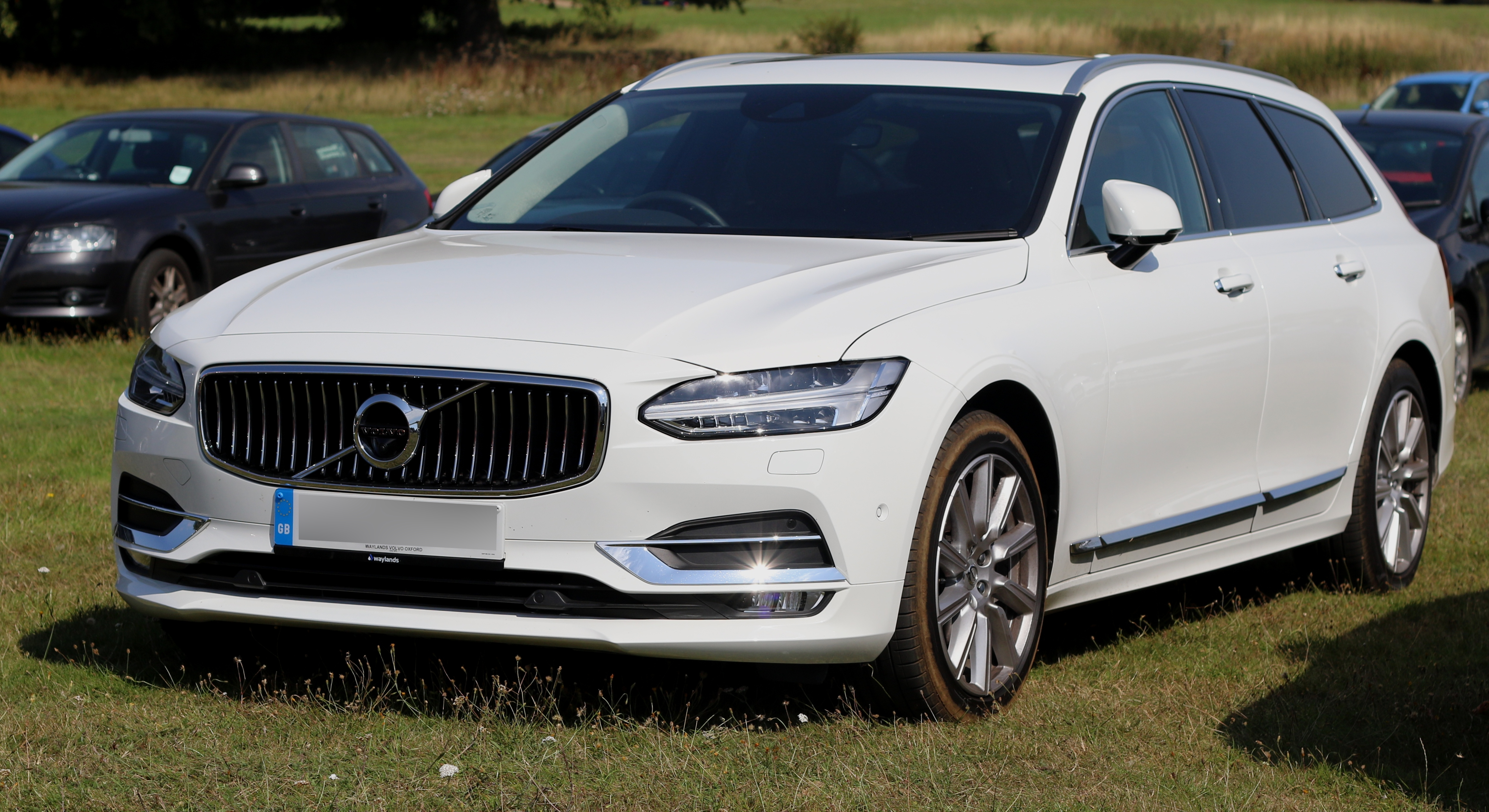
Volvo V90 (UK)

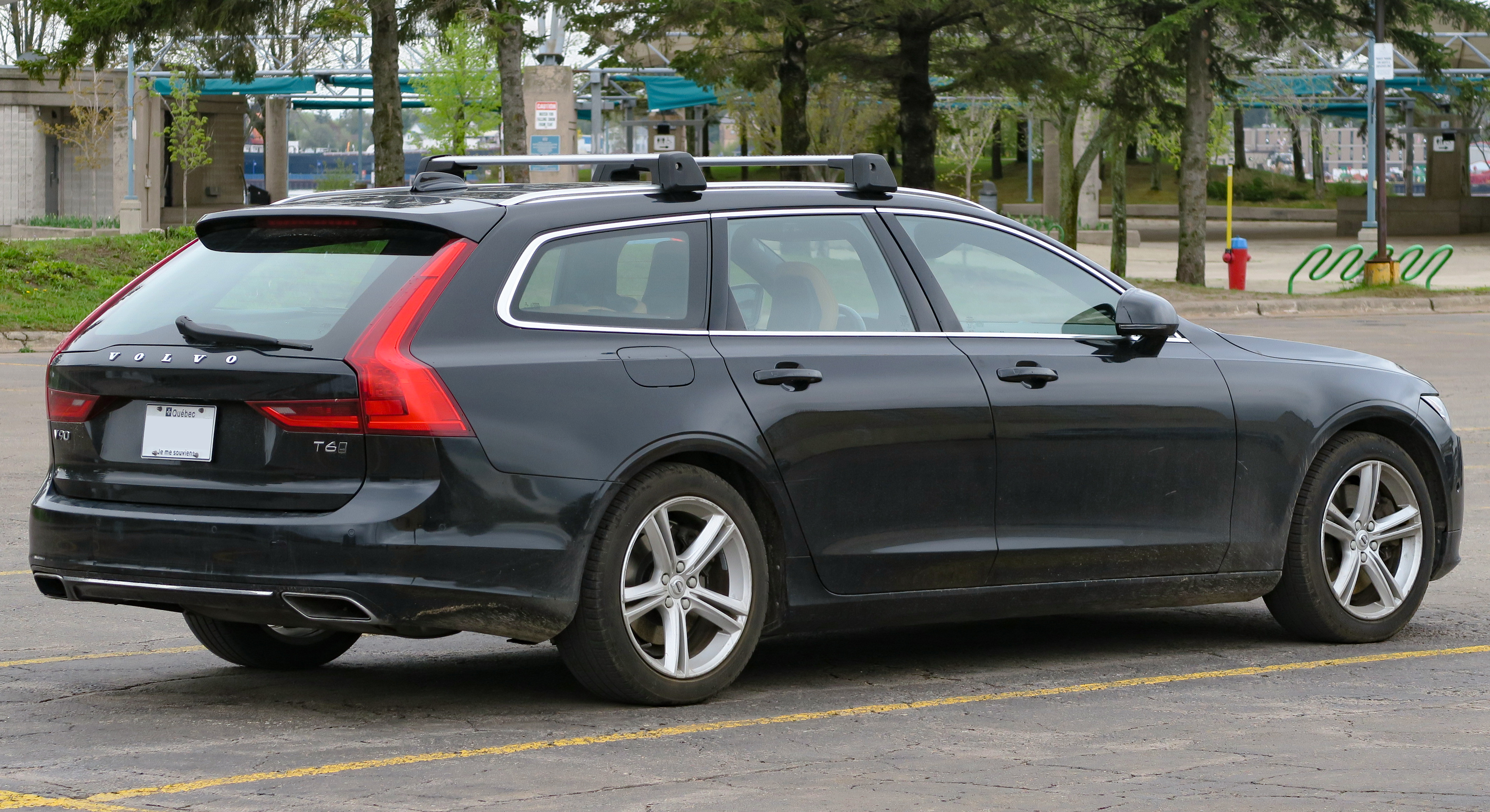
V90 T6

=== V90 Cross Country ===
Previewed before the 2016 Paris motor show, the V90 Cross Country is a raised height, AWD version of the V90 designed for use on rough terrain, unsealed roads and for light off-road usage.

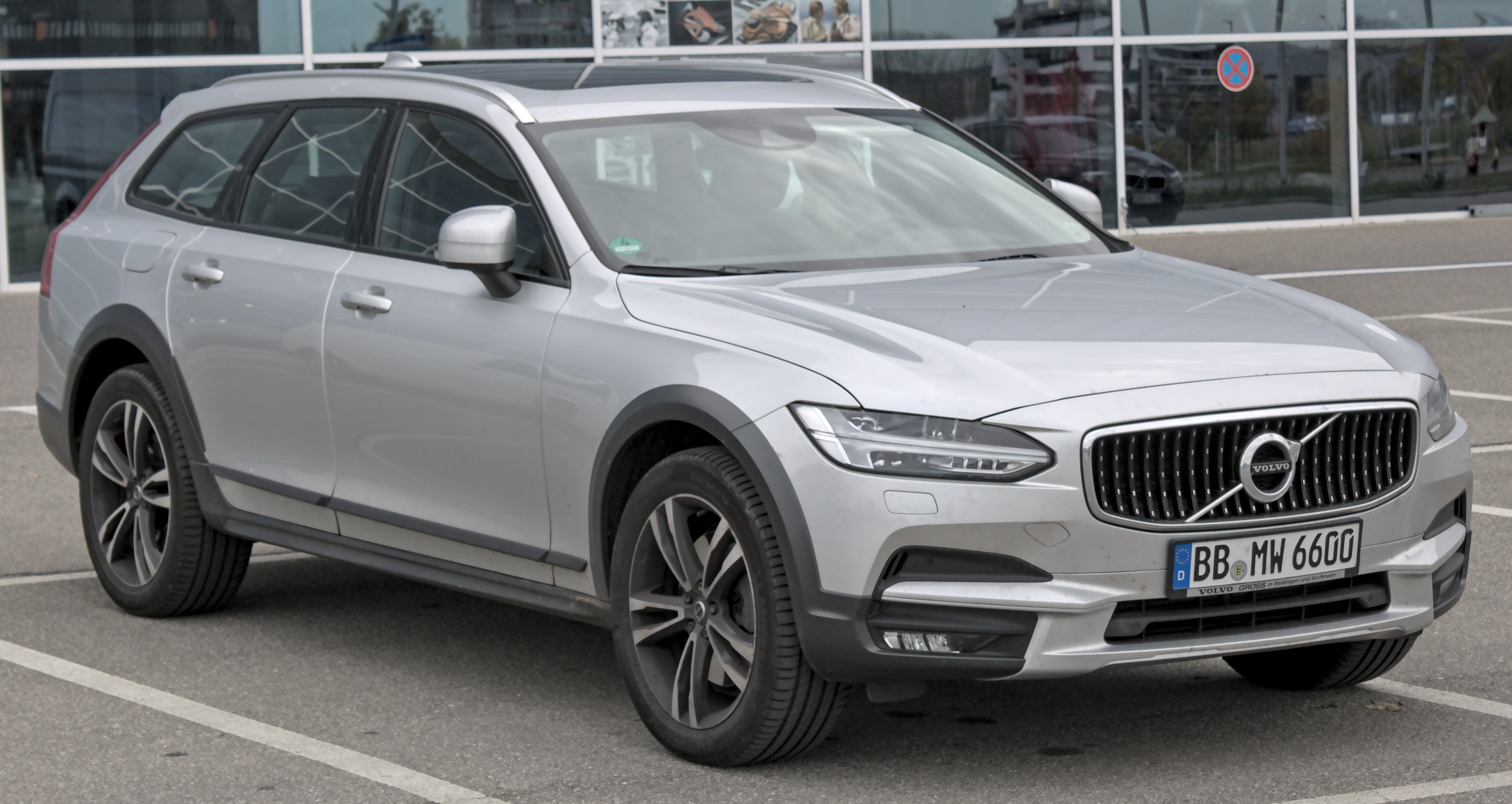
Volvo V90 Cross Country (front)

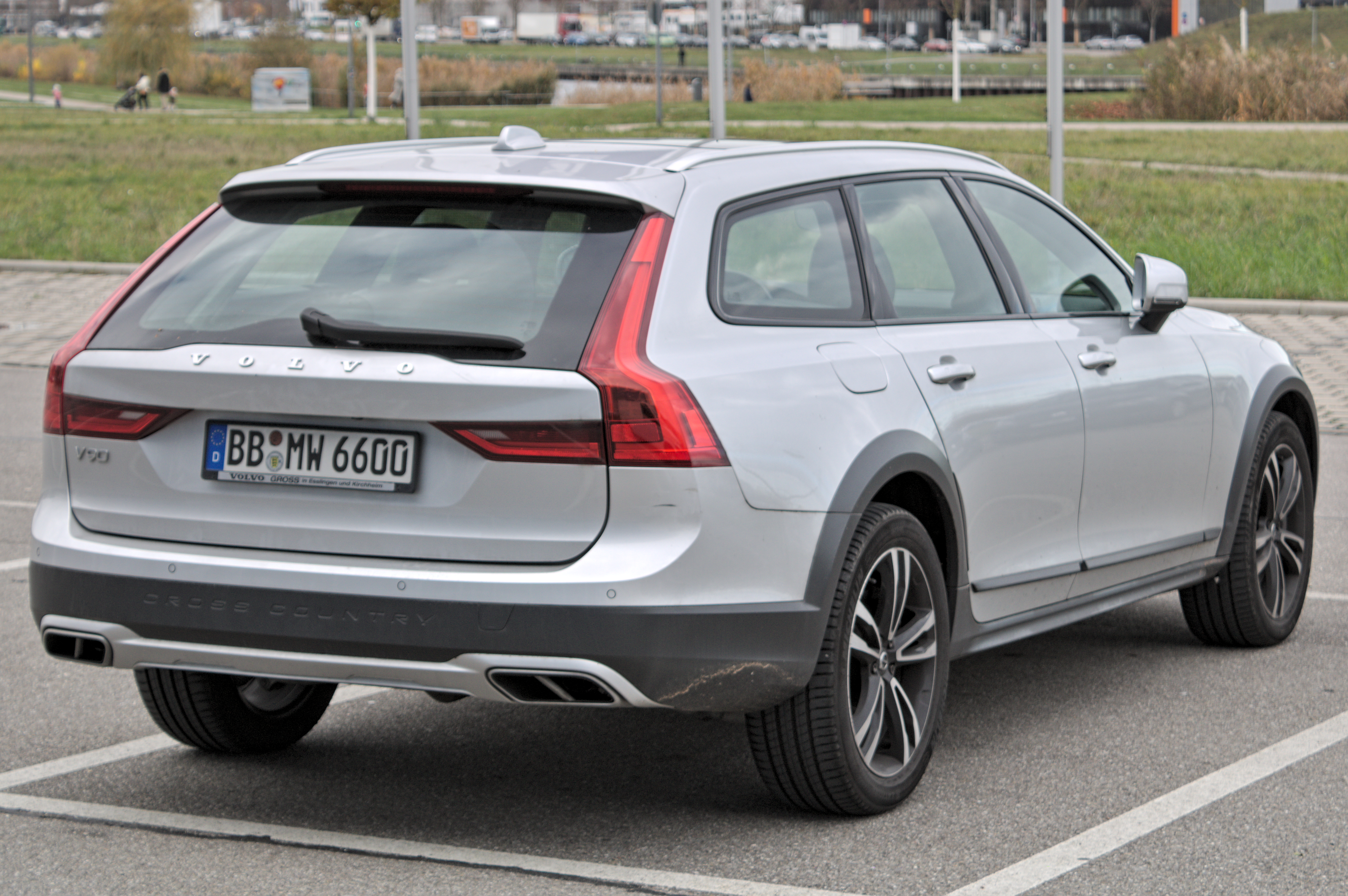
Volvo V90 Cross Country (rear)

==== V90 Cross Country Ocean Race ====
A special version of the V90 Cross Country was announced on 30 October 2017 to celebrate the 2017–18 Volvo Ocean Race. The car has unique orange touches on the front and rear bumper, carbon fibre interior trim and orange stitching and seams and seat belts. It also has a detachable flashlight mounted in the trunk.

In the US market 84 were sold in total (41 as 2018 models, and 43 as 2019 models). In addition, of those sold in the US, 7 had the integrated rear child booster seats for the 2018 model year, and only 1 for the 2019 model year.

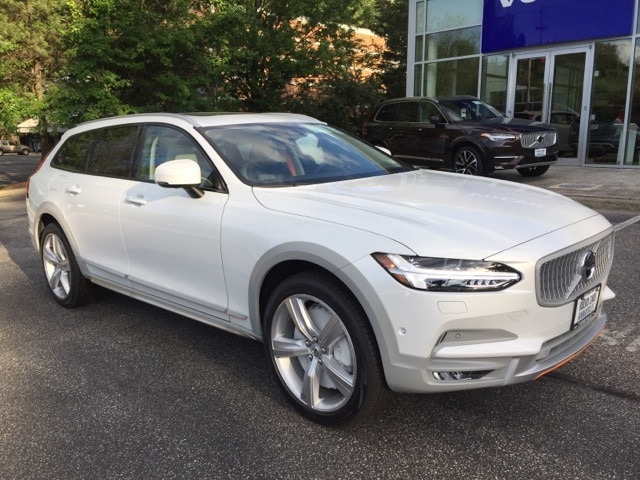
Volvo V90 Cross Country Ocean Race (US)

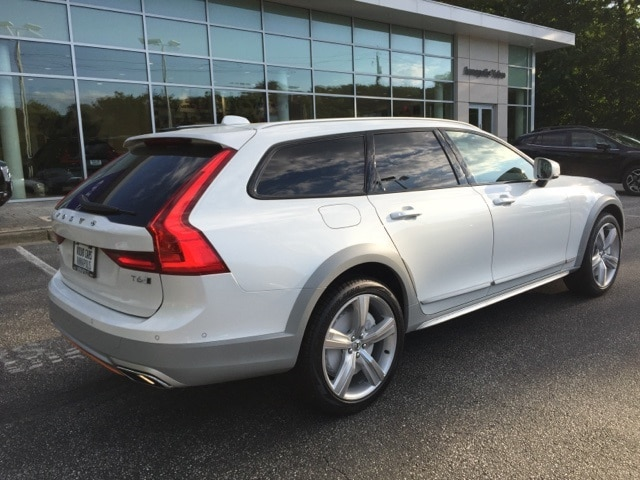
Volvo V90 Cross Country Ocean Race (US)

=== Facelift ===
In February 2020, the official photos of a refreshed V90 were leaked along with the refreshed S90. The taillights now had sequential LEDs, and Inscription variants had a chrome garnish on the front bumper.

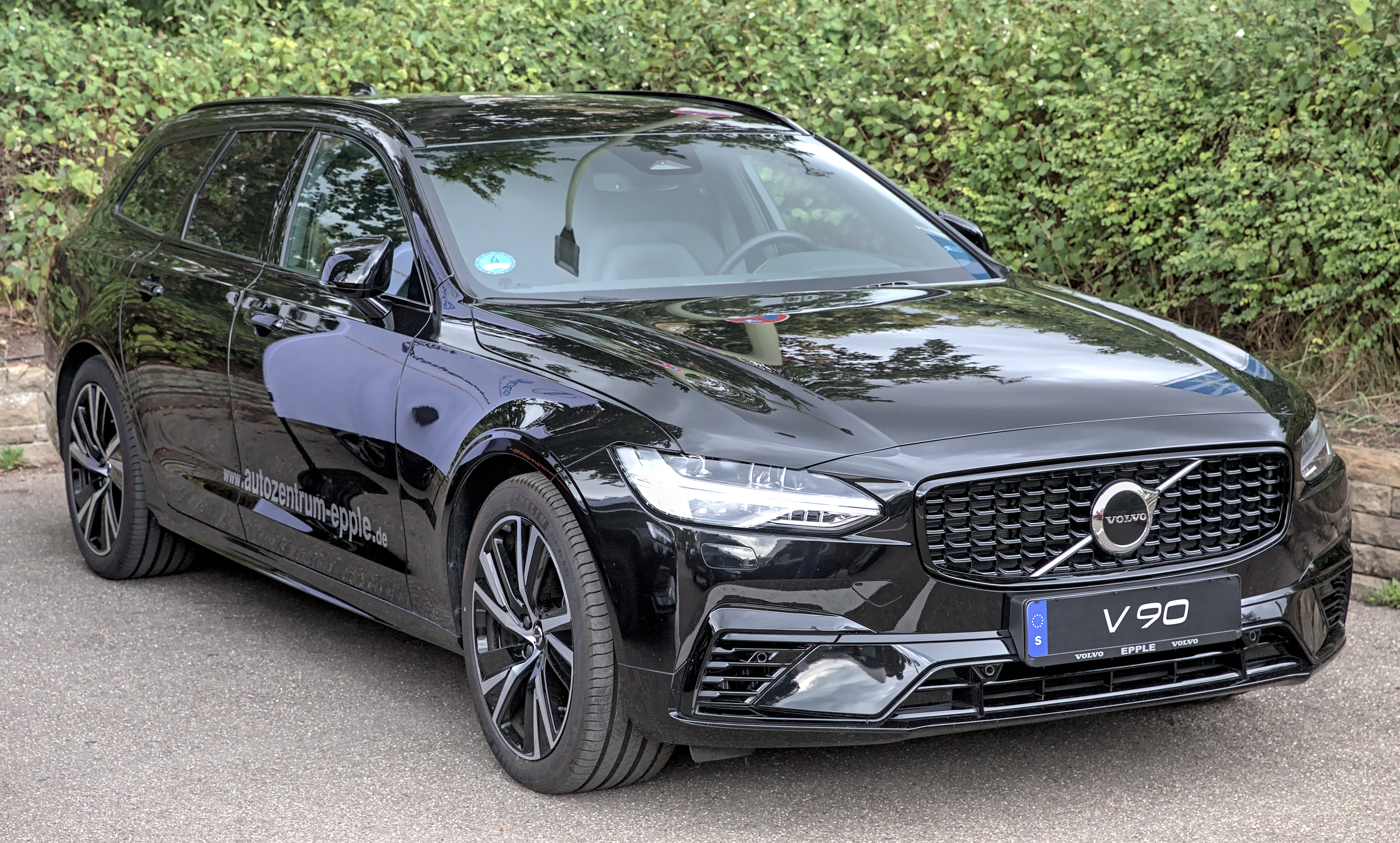
Volvo V90 post-facelift (Germany)

In 2022, the V90 mild hybrid was introduced for better fuel economy and replaces the belt driven supercharger with an electric one, and in addition, uses a belt driven Belt Alternator Starter (BAS) unit. In 2023, Volvo removed conventional engines as an option, meaning mild hybrids are the base engine option in the US. In July 2024, the V90 returned in the United Kingdom in T6 Plus and T8 Ultra trim levels, replacing Core, Plus and Ultimate; these are available only as a plug-in hybrid.

== Engines ==
The V90 is only available with 2.0-litre, 4 cylinder petrol and diesel engines from the VEA family (Drive-E). The more powerful petrol engines are compound charged, as is the plug-in hybrid variant called the T8. The D5 diesel engine features Volvo's new PowerPulse technology that is designed to eliminate turbo lag as well as an i-Art injection system.

Petrol engines
Model	Engine code	Year(s)	Power at rpm	Torque at rpm	Displacement	Comment
T4 (Note: Only available for the S90 LWB and V90)	B4204T44	2017–2025	190 PS (140 kW; 187 hp) at 5000	350 N⋅m (258 lb⋅ft) at 1400–4000	1,969 cc (120.2 in^{3})	Inline 4 with turbocharger
T5; T5 AWD (Note: Only available for the V90 CC)	B4204T20	2016–2025	249 PS (183 kW; 246 hp) at 5500	350 N⋅m (258 lb⋅ft) at 1500–4500	1,969 cc (120.2 in^{3})	Inline 4 with turbocharger
T5; T5 AWD (Note: Only available for the V90 CC)	B4204T23	2016–2025	254 PS (187 kW; 251 hp) at 5500	350 N⋅m (258 lb⋅ft) at 1500–4800	1,969 cc (120.2 in^{3})	Inline 4 with turbocharger
T6 AWD	B4204T27	2016–2025	320 PS (235 kW; 316 hp) at 5700	400 N⋅m (295 lb⋅ft) at 2200–5400	1,969 cc (120.2 in^{3})	Inline 4 with turbocharger; and supercharger

Diesel engines
Model	Engine code	Year(s)	Power at rpm	Torque at rpm	Displacement	Comment
D3	D4204T9	2016–2025	150 PS (110 kW; 148 hp) at 3750	320 N⋅m (236 lb⋅ft) at 1750–3000	1,969 cc (120.2 in^{3})	Inline 4 with turbocharger
D3 AWD (Note: Only available for the V90)	D4204T4	2016–2025	150 PS (110 kW; 148 hp) at 4250	350 N⋅m (258 lb⋅ft) at 1500–2500	1,969 cc (120.2 in^{3})	Inline 4 with turbocharger
D4; D4 AWD	D4204T14	2016–2025	190 PS (140 kW; 187 hp) at 4250	400 N⋅m (295 lb⋅ft) at 1750–2500	1,969 cc (120.2 in^{3})	Inline 4 with two turbochargers
D5 AWD	D4204T23	2016–2025	235 PS (173 kW; 232 hp) at 4000	480 N⋅m (354 lb⋅ft) at 1750–2500	1,969 cc (120.2 in^{3})	Inline 4 with two turbochargers

Hybrid engines
Model	Engine code	Year(s)	Power at rpm	Torque at rpm	Displacement	Comment
T8 AWD; T8 Twin Engine	B4204T28	2017–2025	318 PS (234 kW; 314 hp) at 6000; + 87 PS (64 kW; 86 hp) electric	400 N⋅m (295 lb⋅ft) at 2200–5400; + 240 N⋅m (177 lb⋅ft) electric	1,969 cc (120.2 in^{3})	Inline 4 with turbocharger and supercharger; + electric motor driving the rear wheels
T8 AWD; T8 Twin Engine	B4204T35	2018–2025	320 PS (235 kW; 316 hp) at 5700; + 87 PS (64 kW; 86 hp) electric	400 N⋅m (295 lb⋅ft) at 2200–5400; + 240 N⋅m (177 lb⋅ft) electric	1,969 cc (120.2 in^{3})	Inline 4 with turbocharger and supercharger; + electric motor driving the rear wheels
