= Volvo S90 =

Swedish executive sedan

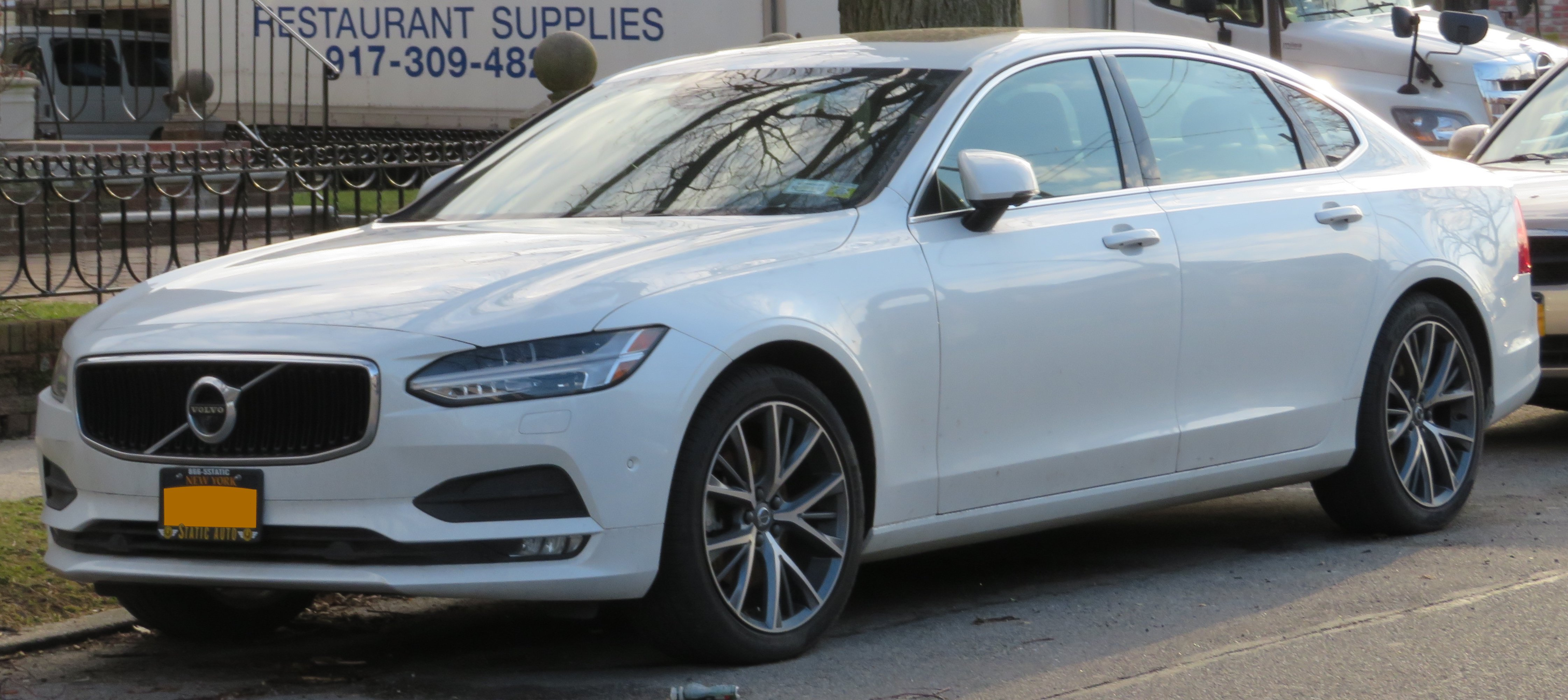
- 2018 Volvo S90 (US)

Overview
- Manufacturer: Volvo Cars
- Production: 2016–2017 (Sweden); 2016–present (China)
- Model years: 2017–2025 (United States, Australia, Canada, Europe, and India); 2017–present (China, South Korea, Vietnam)
- Assembly: Sweden: Torslanda (Torslandaverken, until mid-2017); China: Daqing (DVCM) (Note: S90L only.); Malaysia: Shah Alam (VCMM); India: Bengaluru (Volvo Trucks)
- Designer: Thomas Ingenlath; Örjan Sterner (Exterior); Tisha Johnson (Interior)

Body and chassis
- Class: Executive car (E)
- Body style: 4-door saloon
- Layout: Front-engine, front-wheel drive or all-wheel drive
- Platform: SPA platform
- Related: Volvo V90 II; Polestar 1; Volvo XC90 II

Powertrain
- Engine: Petrol: 2.0L I4; (140kW–235kW); Diesel: 2.0L I4; (140kW–173kW); Hybrid: 2.0L I4 petrol; (234kW–235kW + 64kW)
- Electric motor: 2x Permanent Magnet Synchronous AC Motors 34 kW (46 PS) (front) 64 kW (87 PS) (rear)
- Transmission: 6-speed M66 manual; 6-speed M76 manual; 8-speed Aisin TG-81SC automatic
- Hybrid drivetrain: Plug-in hybrid Mild Hybrid
- Battery: 9.2 kWh lithium-ion battery; 10.4 kWh; 11.6 kWh lithium-ion battery
- Electric range: 45 km (28 mi) (NEDC)

Dimensions
- Wheelbase: 2,935–3,060 mm (115.6–120.5 in)
- Length: S90: 4,963 mm (195.4 in); S90L: 5,083 mm (200.1 in)
- Width: 1,890 mm (74.4 in); 2,019 mm (79.5 in) with mirrors
- Height: S90: 1,443–1,450 mm (56.8–57.1 in)
- Kerb weight: S90: 1,800–2,150 kg (3,968–4,740 lb)

Chronology
- Predecessor: Volvo S80 II
- Successor: Volvo ES90

The Volvo S90 is an executive sedan manufactured and marketed by Swedish automaker Volvo Cars from 2016. Its estate variant is called the Volvo V90.

== Models ==
For the model year of 2017 (the first model year), a short and long wheelbase sedan as well as an estate model were made available. For 2017, the short wheelbase model was sold in North America and Europe, while the long wheelbase model was primarily sold in China. Volvo has hinted at possible coupe variants, but not until at least 2020 as the Polestar 1.

=== S90 ===
Before its reveal, the first official pictures of the S90 were shown on Wednesday, 2 December 2015. The S90 was unveiled to the public in January 2016, at the North American International Auto Show in Detroit, Michigan. The S90's design was well received, winning the Production Car Design of the Year award for 2015.

While not a direct successor to the second-generation S80, the S90 replaces it as the flagship sedan in Volvo's lineup. Several trim levels are available, ranging from Momentum to Inscription. In July 2016, an optional, cosmetic R-Design package was announced. A long wheelbase version was announced for availability in the United States. A mild hybrid version was offered in 2020. In 2023, Volvo removed conventional engines as an option, meaning mild hybrids are the base engine option in the US.

In Cambodia, the S90 was previously imported and sold by HGB Auto, primarily in short‑wheelbase form, with only the S90 Inscription available through authorized dealerships. In subsequent years, Volvo significantly reduced its presence in the Cambodian market, and as of the mid‑2020s the S90 is no longer officially offered.

For the 2022 model year in the United Kingdom, the range was limited to the S90 Recharge, a mild-hybrid sedan. The S90 Recharge was limited to Plus and Ultimate trim levels with the T8 AWD mild-hybrid engine, a 2.0-litre 455-horsepower (339 kW; 461 PS) 4-cylinder available with all-wheel-drive only.

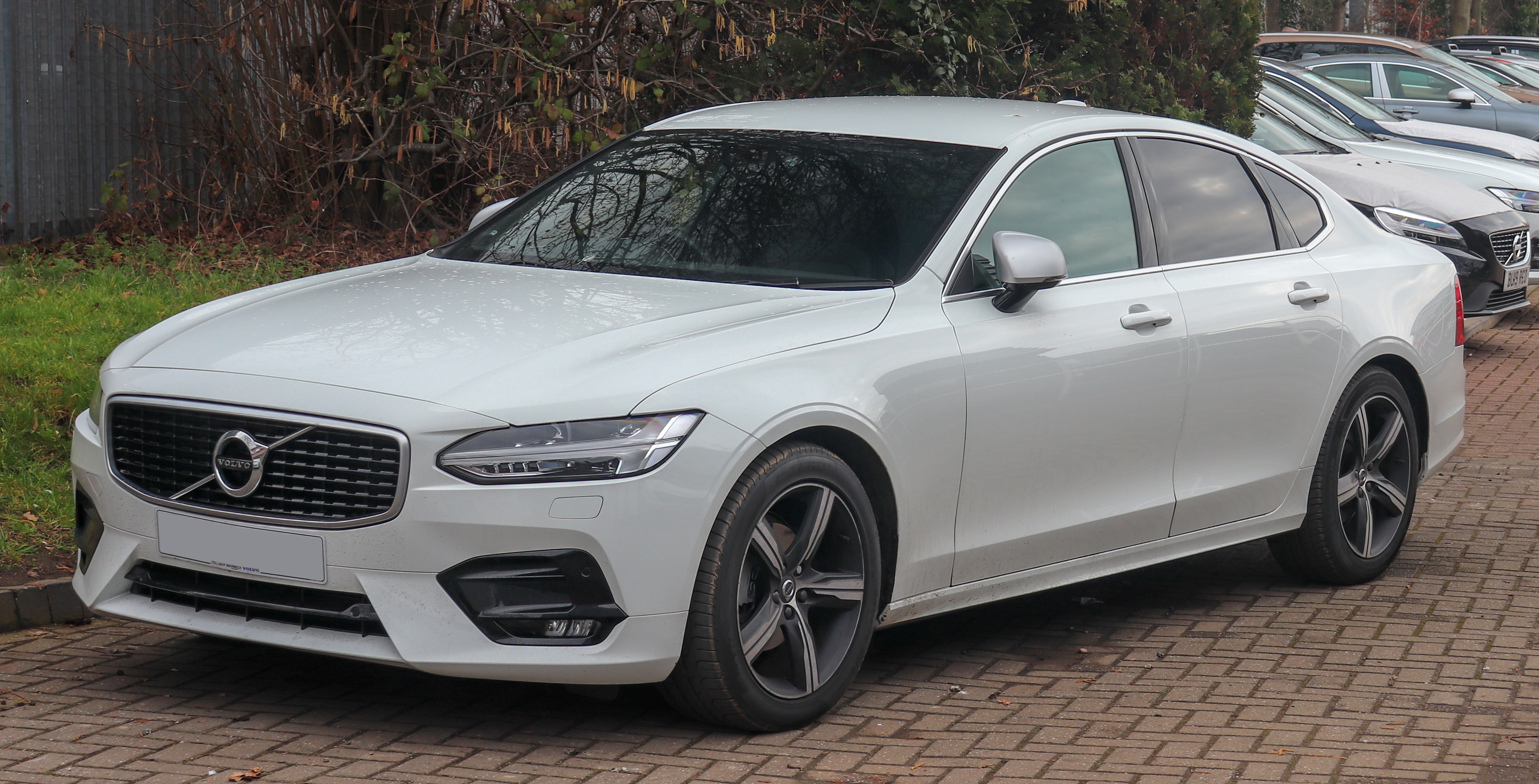
Volvo S90 R-Design

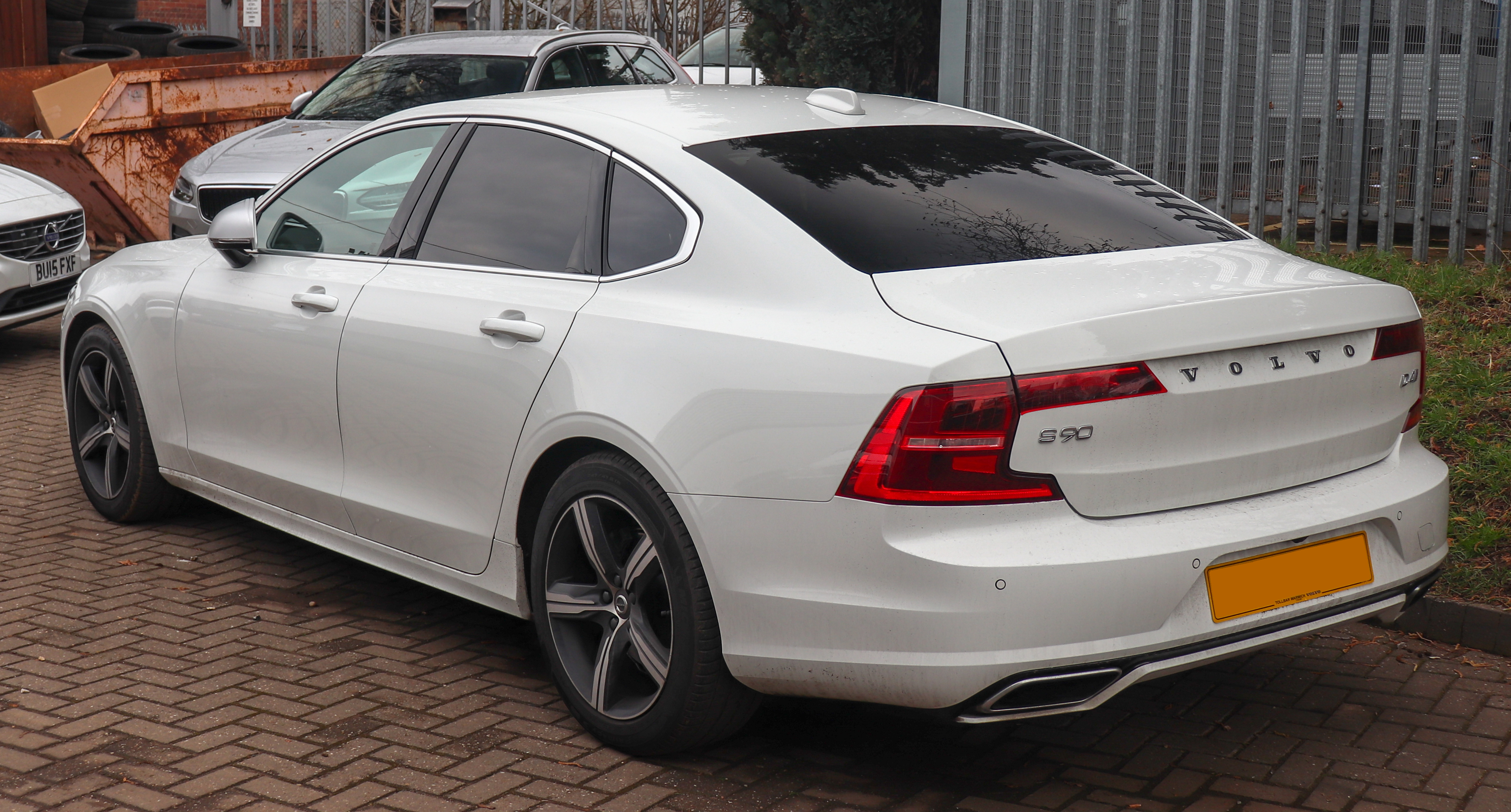
Volvo S90 R-Design

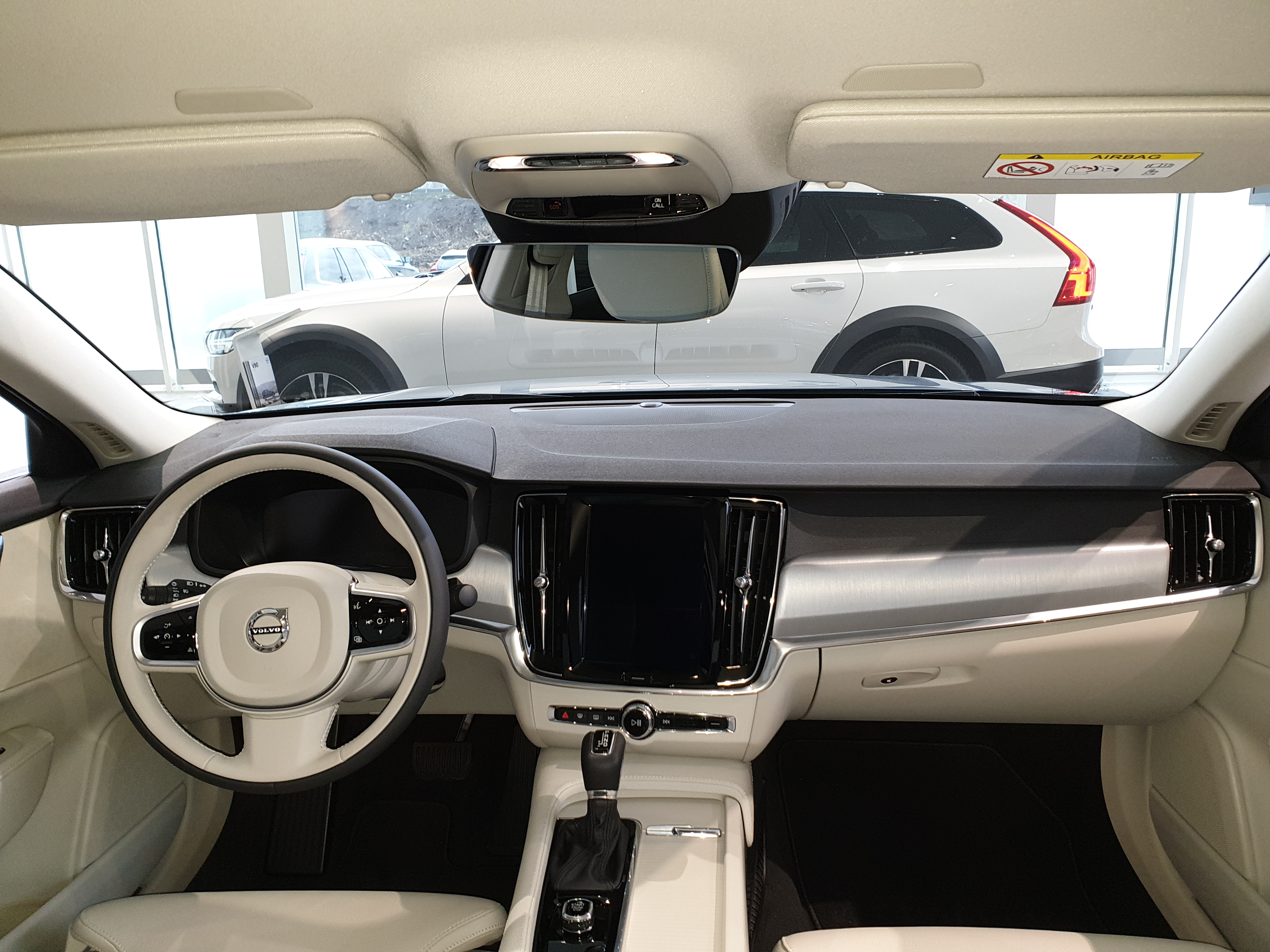
Interior

=== S90 Long Wheelbase ===
For the 2017 model year, a long wheelbase version of the S90 was made in China, primarily for that market. It is stretched by 12 cm (4.7 in) behind the B pillar. This initial Chinese variant was not badged as "S90L".

For the 2018 model year onwards, the long wheelbase S90 replaced the standard wheelbase model in the United States.

Both wheelbases were offered in Europe and the Middle East from the 2018 model year.

For the 2023 model year, an interior facelift of the S90 was made in China market.

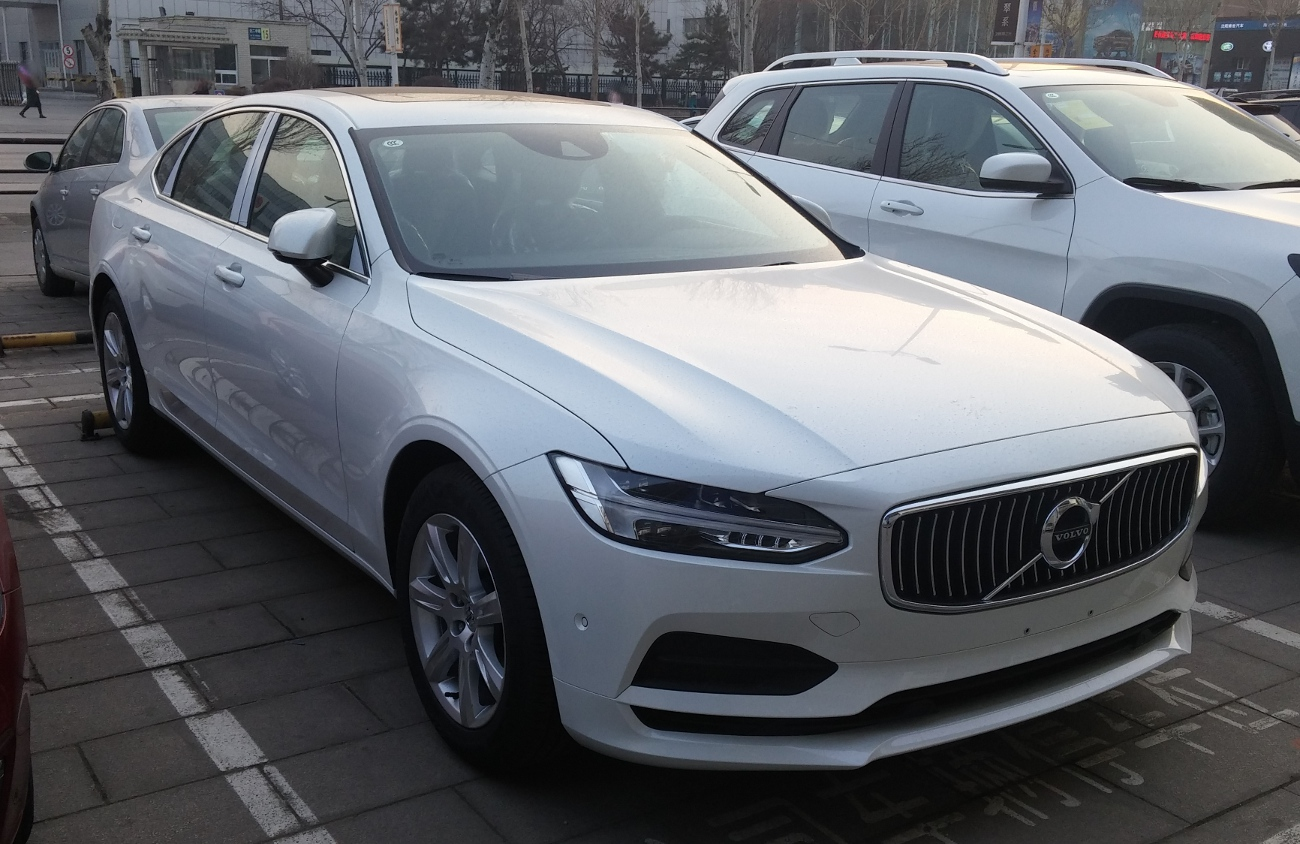
Volvo S90 (CN)

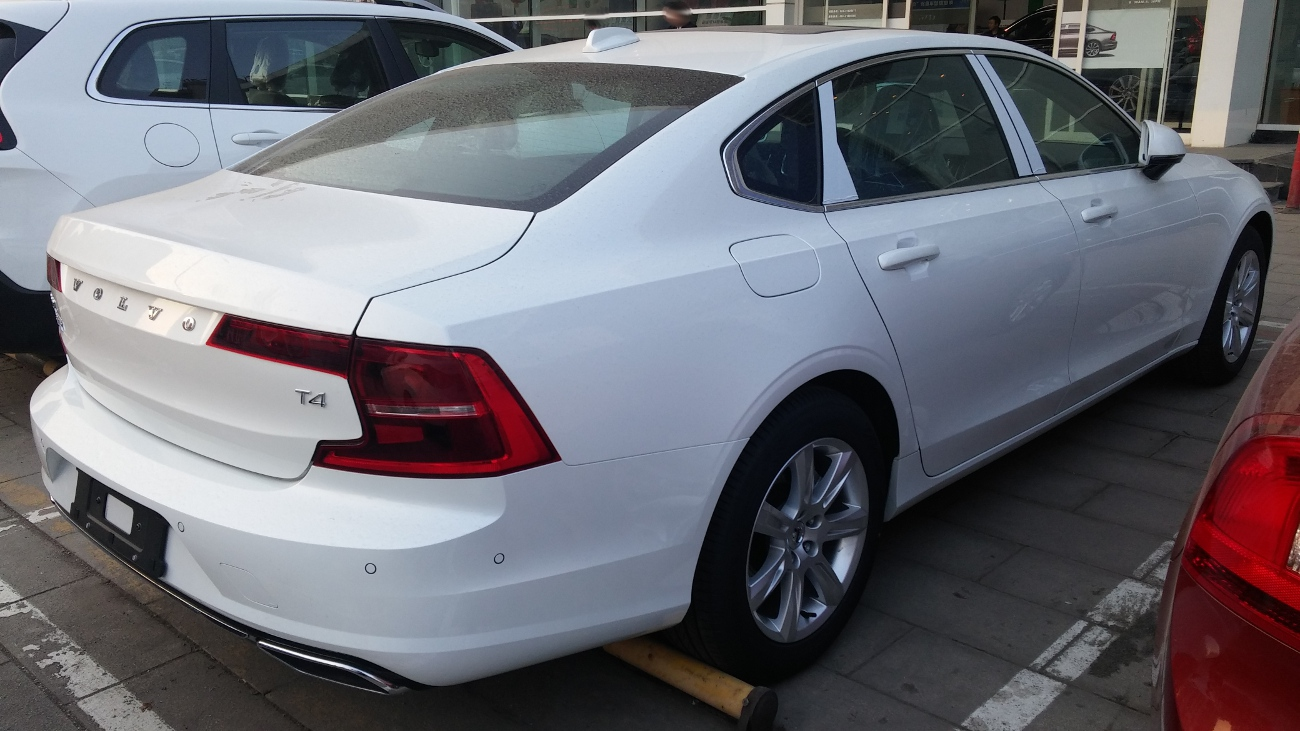
Volvo S90 (CN)

=== Production ===
By mid-2017, the Swedish Torslandaverken Plant no longer produced the S90. Production and assembly has mainly moved to the Chinese Daqing plant. Models were shipped to Europe from China by train. It is also locally assembled (CKD) in Volvo Car Manufacturing Malaysia in Shah Alam, Malaysia and Volvo Trucks Bengaluru plant in India. Production ended in late 2024, with 2025 being the last model year.

=== First facelift ===
In February 2020, the official photos of refreshed S90 were leaked along with the refreshed V90. The taillights now have sequential LED indicators & Inscription variants get chrome garnish on the front bumper.

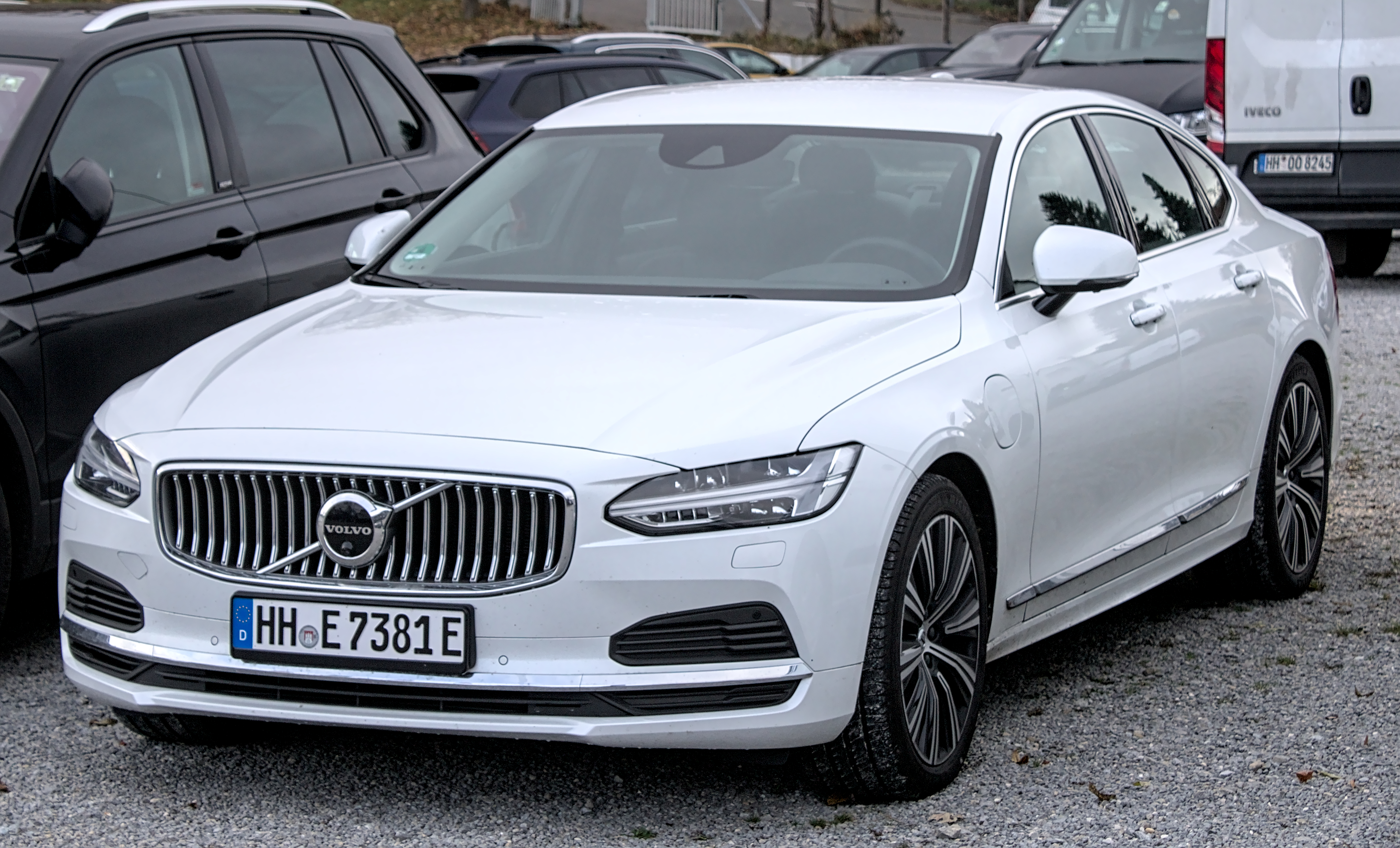
Volvo S90 first facelift (Germany)

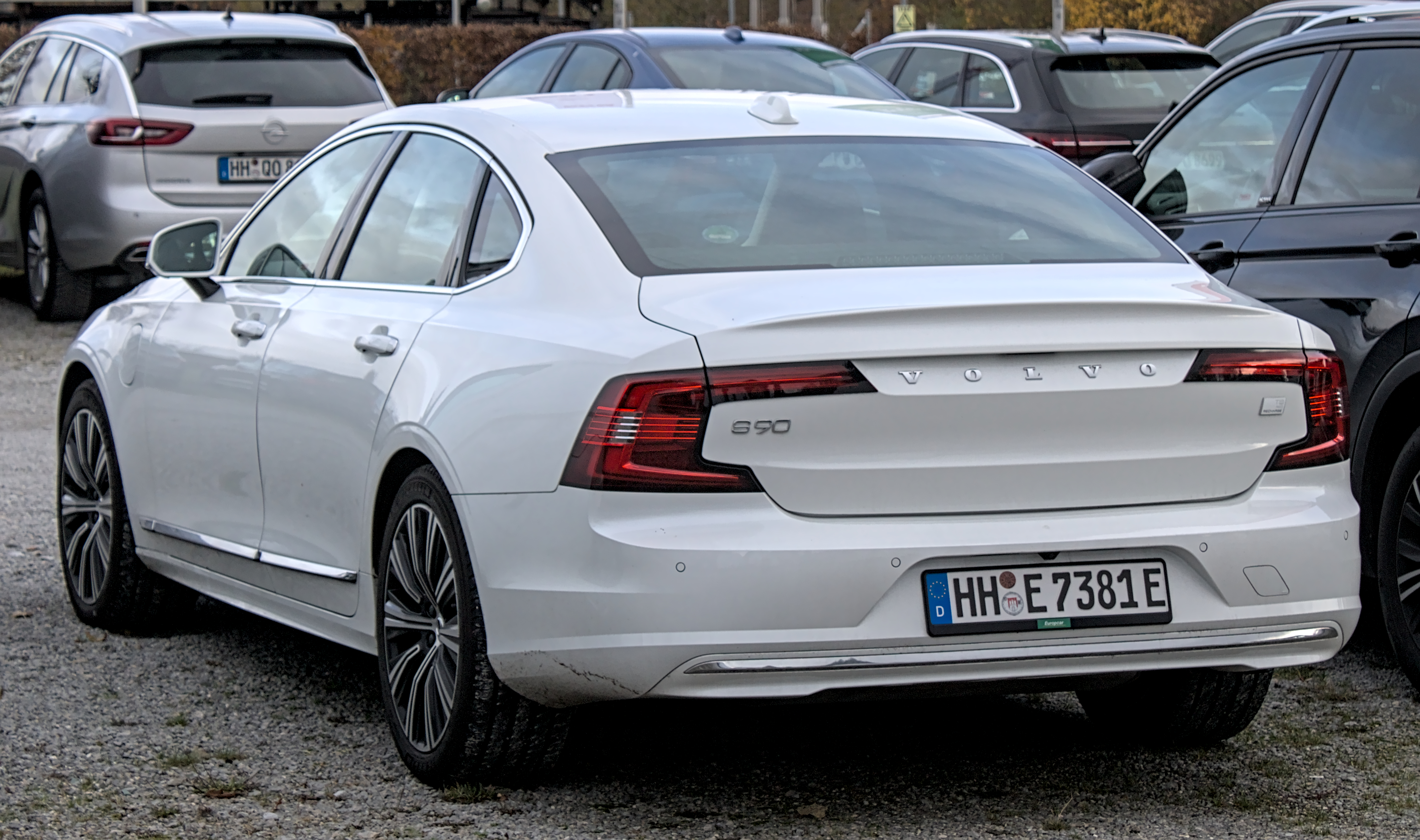
Volvo S90 first facelift (Germany)

=== Second facelift ===
The second facelift of the S90 was introduced on 17 April 2025. It has been given the same front end as the 2024 XC90 facelift, and a new 11.2-inch infotainment screen.

However, the Volvo S90 did not receive this second facelift in the United States, Australia, Canada, and Europe as it was discontinued in those markets due to poor sales and, in the case of the US market, the Trump administration's new tariffs on Chinese-built vehicles, as the Volvo S90 for these markets was solely manufactured in China. Similarly, the S90 was also discontinued in India like the Jaguar XF due to poor sales and tough competition from the Mercedes Benz E-Class, BMW 5 Series, Lexus ES and Audi A6. Despite this, the S90 will continue to be sold in other markets (China, South Korea, Vietnam) where it will receive the second facelift.

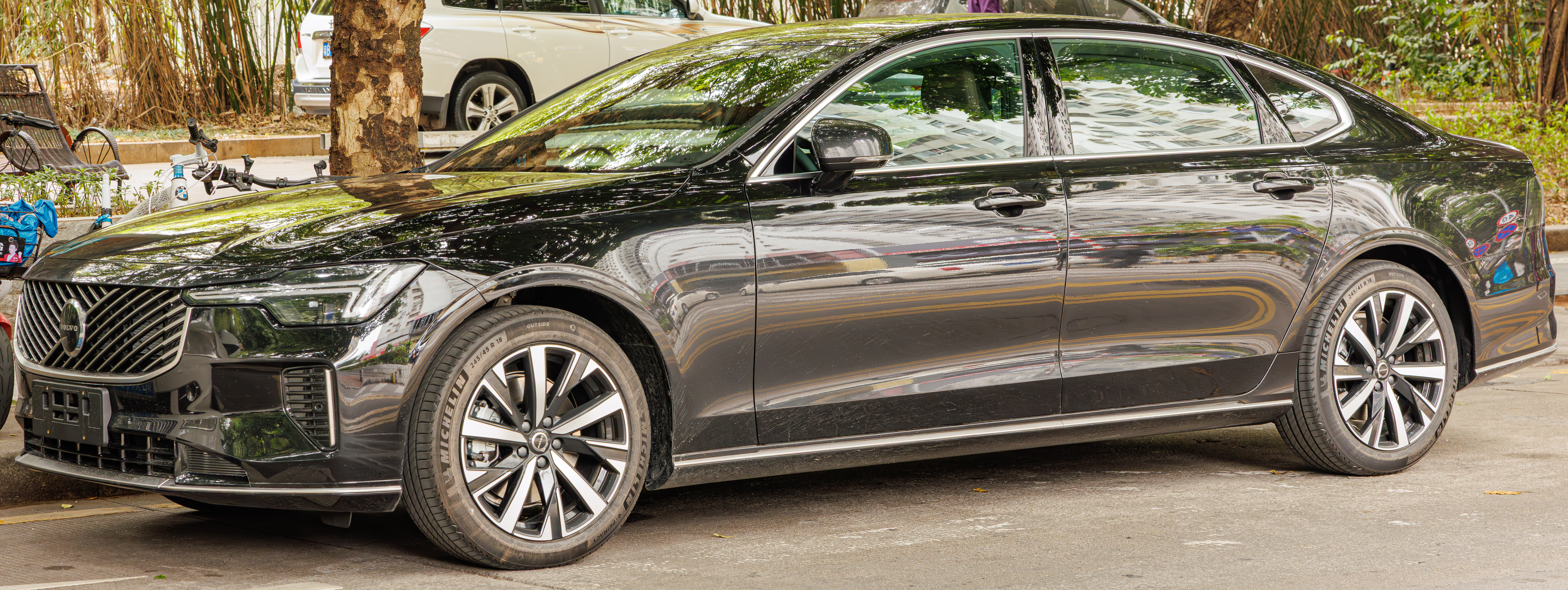
Volvo S90 second facelift (China)

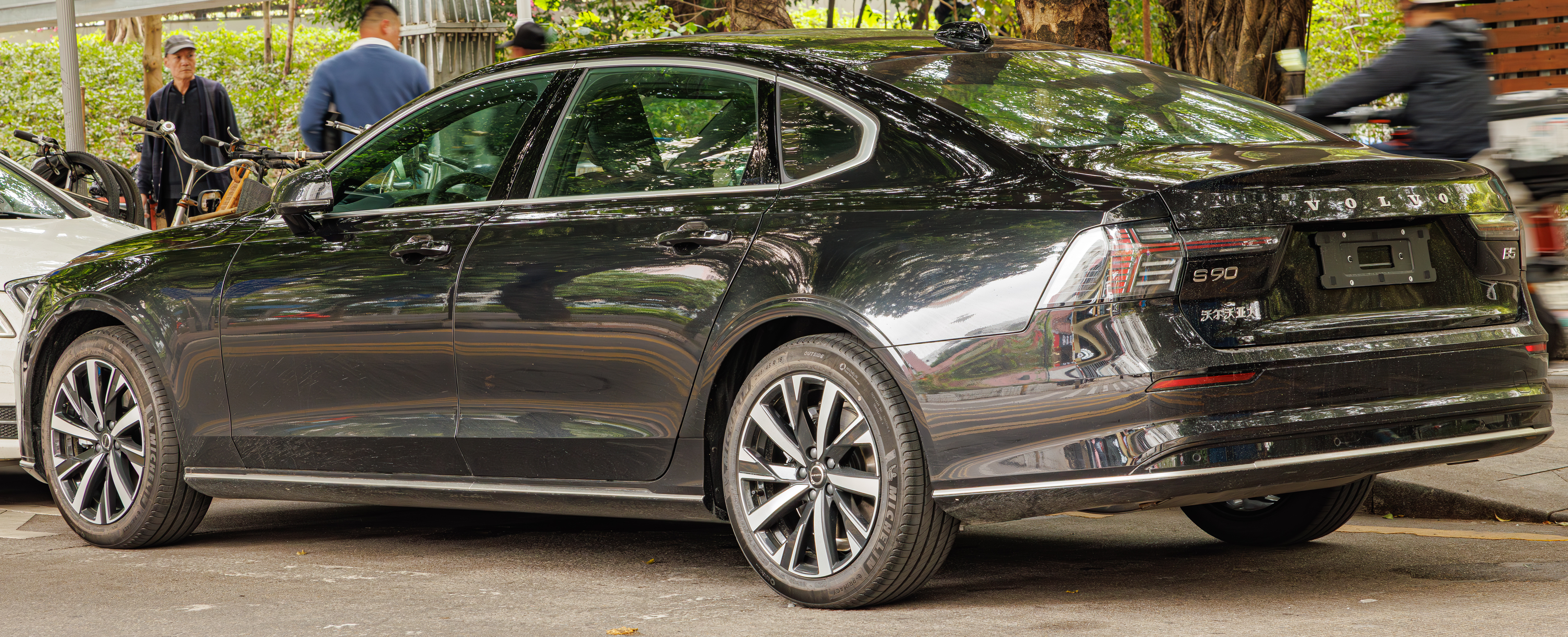
Rear view (China)

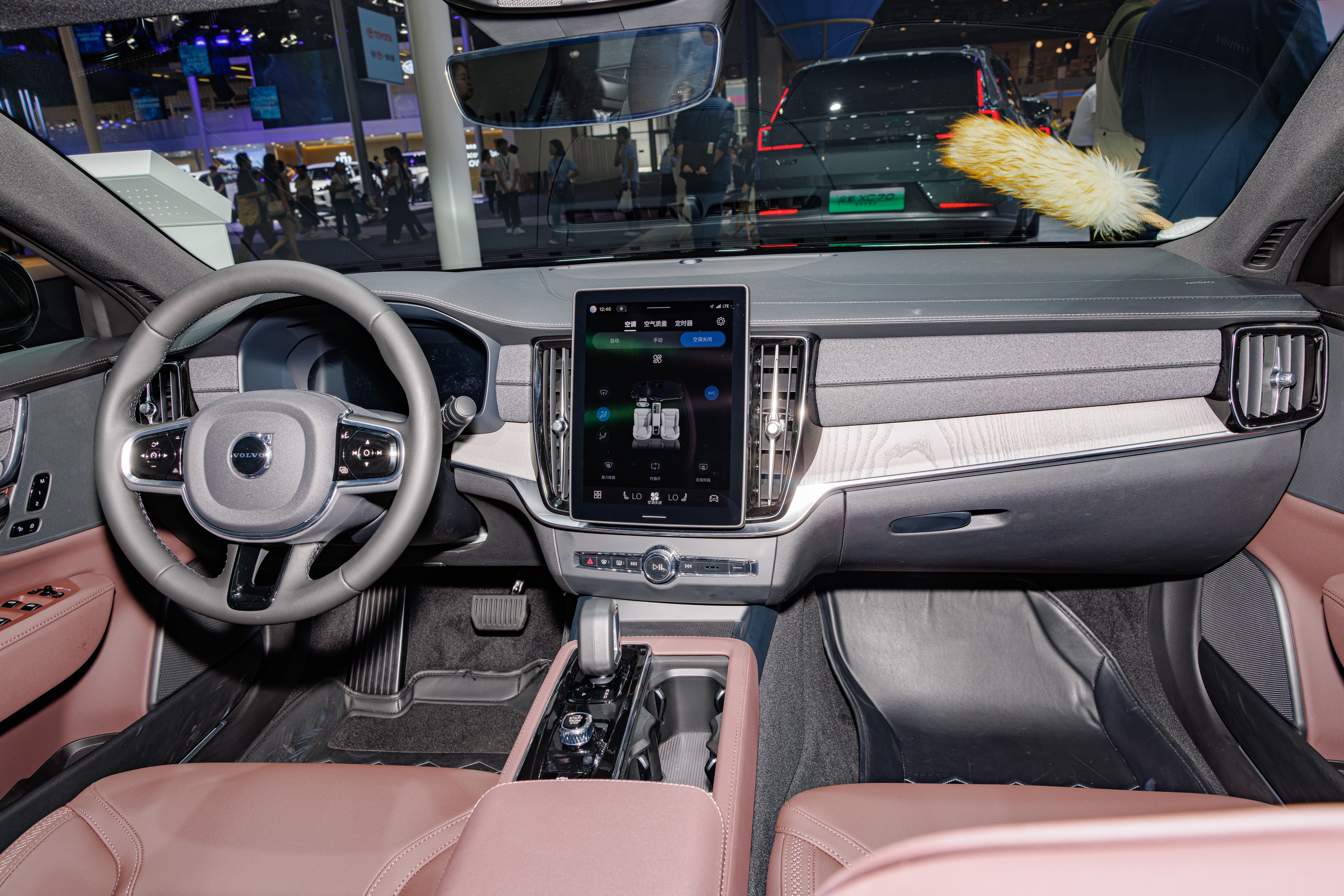
Interior

=== Replacement ===
In December 2023, Volvo revealed that the pre-production models of the electric successor to the S90, codenamed V551 and rumored to be named the ES90, had started testing in China. It is based on the same SPA2 platform used by the EX90, and uses the same 111 kWh battery pack.

== Engines ==
The S90 is only available with 2.0-litre, four-cylinder petrol and diesel engines from the VEA family (Drive-E). The more powerful petrol engines are compound charged, as is the plug-in hybrid variant called the T8. The D5 diesel engine features Volvo's new PowerPulse technology that is designed to eliminate turbo lag, as well as an i Art injection system.

Petrol engines
Model	Engine code	Year(s)	Power at rpm	Torque at rpm	Displacement	Comment
T4 (Note: Only available for the S90 Long Wheelbase and V90.)	B4204T44	2017–present	190 PS (140 kW; 187 hp) at 5000	350 N⋅m (258 lb⋅ft) at 1400–4000	1,969 cc (120.2 in^{3})	Inline 4 with turbocharger
T5; T5 AWD (Note: Only available for the V90 CC.)	B4204T20	2016–present	249 PS (183 kW; 246 hp) at 5500	350 N⋅m (258 lb⋅ft) at 1500–4500	1,969 cc (120.2 in^{3})	Inline 4 with turbocharger
T5; T5 AWD (Note: Only available for the V90 CC.)	B4204T23	2016–present	254 PS (187 kW; 251 hp) at 5500	350 N⋅m (258 lb⋅ft) at 1500–4800	1,969 cc (120.2 in^{3})	Inline 4 with turbocharger
T6 AWD	B4204T27	2016–present	320 PS (235 kW; 316 hp) at 5700	400 N⋅m (295 lb⋅ft) at 2200–5400	1,969 cc (120.2 in^{3})	Inline 4 with turbocharger; and supercharger

Diesel engines
Model	Engine code	Year(s)	Power at rpm	Torque at rpm	Displacement	Comment
D3	D4204T9	2016–present	150 PS (110 kW; 148 hp) at 3750	320 N⋅m (236 lb⋅ft) at 1750–3000	1,969 cc (120.2 in^{3})	Inline 4 with turbocharger
D3 AWD (Note: Only available for the V90.)	D4204T4	2016–present	150 PS (110 kW; 148 hp) at 4250	350 N⋅m (258 lb⋅ft) at 1500–2500	1,969 cc (120.2 in^{3})	Inline 4 with turbocharger
D4; D4 AWD	D4204T14	2016–present	190 PS (140 kW; 187 hp) at 4250	400 N⋅m (295 lb⋅ft) at 1750–2500	1,969 cc (120.2 in^{3})	Inline 4 with two turbochargers
D5 AWD	D4204T23	2016–present	235 PS (173 kW; 232 hp) at 4000	480 N⋅m (354 lb⋅ft) at 1750–2500	1,969 cc (120.2 in^{3})	Inline 4 with two turbochargers

Hybrid engines
Model	Engine code	Year(s)	Power at rpm	Torque at rpm	Displacement	Comment
T8 AWD; T8 Twin Engine	B4204T28	2017–present	318 PS (234 kW; 314 hp) at 6000; + 87 PS (64 kW; 86 hp) electric	400 N⋅m (295 lb⋅ft) at 2200–5400; + 240 N⋅m (177 lb⋅ft) electric	1,969 cc (120.2 in^{3})	Inline 4 with turbocharger and supercharger; + electric motor driving the rear wheels
T8 AWD; T8 Twin Engine; RECHARGE T8	B4204T35	2016–present	320 PS (235 kW; 316 hp) at 5700; + 87 PS (64 kW; 86 hp) electric	400 N⋅m (295 lb⋅ft) at 2200–5400; + 240 N⋅m (177 lb⋅ft) electric	1,969 cc (120.2 in^{3})	Inline 4 with turbocharger and supercharger; + electric motor driving the rear wheels
RECHARGE	B4204T35	2022–present	317 PS (233 kW; 313 hp) at 6000; + 143 PS (105 kW; 141 hp) at 15900 electric; 460 PS (338 kW; 454 hp) combined	400 N⋅m (295 lb⋅ft) at 3000–5400; + 309 N⋅m (228 lb⋅ft) electric	1,969 cc (120.2 in^{3})	Inline 4 with turbocharger and supercharger; + electric motor driving the rear wheels

== Safety ==
ANCAP test results* Volvo S90 (2017, aligned with Euro NCAP)
Test	Points	%
Overall:	5 /5 stars	
Adult occupant:	34.7	91%
Child occupant:	39.3	80%
Pedestrian:	32.2	76%
Safety assist:	11.2	93%

The S90 was one of the IIHS's Top Safety Picks for 2017, 2018, 2019, and earned Top Safety Pick+ in 2021, 2022 and 2023.

2017 Volvo S90 IIHS Ratings
Category	Rating
Small overlap front	Good
Moderate overlap front	Good
Side impact	Good
Roof strength	Good
Head restraints & seats	Good

== Sales ==
Year	China			US	Turkey
Year	S90	PHEV	Total		
2016			968	2,756	
2017			25,021	8,640	
2018			38,011	6,967	
2019			42,668	2,545	
2020			35,283	1,896	
2021			19,113	608	
2022			34,728	1,281	
2023	36,184	3,128	39,312	1,451	
2024	28,457	3,103	31,560	1,364	1,720
2025	18,419	2,737	21,156	1,001	
