= Volvo Car Charleston Plant =

Car factory in South Carolina

- Operated: 2018–present
- Location: 1801 Volvo Car Drive; Ridgeville, South Carolina, United States
- Coordinates: 33.1348°N 80.2461°W
- Products: Volvo EX90; Polestar 3
- Employees: 2,000
- Area: 1,600 acres (650 ha)
- Volume: 2,300,000 square feet (210,000 m^{2})
- Owner: Volvo Cars

The Volvo Car Charleston Plant is an automobile assembly plant in Ridgeville, South Carolina, that began production in 2018. It has the capacity to produce 150,000 vehicles annually.

== History ==
On May 11, 2015, Volvo selected Berkeley County, South Carolina (outside of Charleston in the Ridgeville area) for its first-ever U.S. auto manufacturing plant. The company announced a $500 million investment aimed at creating 2,000 jobs, with the capacity to build up to 100,000 cars annually. The automaker broke ground on its first-ever US facility on September 25, 2015.

In September 2017, Volvo doubled its investment by adding an additional $520 million, bringing the collective investment to more than $1 billion. It will support a second production line at the facility, and will add 4,000 total workers at the plant. The factory was opened in June 2018 to produce the S60 sedan for both North American and European markets.

On June 5, 2024, Volvo started production of the fully electric EX90 SUV at the plant, followed by the Polestar 3 SUV in August of the same year. Also in June of that year, Volvo announced that it will stop producing the S60 sedan by the end of the month, following poor sales in the United States in which the automaker sold only 1,406 units nationwide in 2023, down from 5,277 in 2022.

In January 2026, during the CES 2026 showcase, Geely, Volvo's parent company, made a failed attempt to enter the U.S. market by using this plant to produce Zeekr and Lynk & Co vehicles. To meet U.S. consumer demand and mitigate the effects of import tariffs, Volvo will begin manufacturing its best-selling XC60 SUV at the plant in late 2026. Additionally, the company plans to build a next-generation XC90 at the site in October 2028.

In March 2026, Volvo and Polestar announced the consolidation of global production for the Polestar 3 at Volvo's U.S. plant, moving operations away from China to drive efficiencies and navigate trade tariffs. However on June 25, 2026, Polestar announced that it will leave the United States market due to the use of Chinese components on its vehicles, leaving Polestar 3 production at the plant uncertainty.

== Products ==
=== Current ===
- Volvo EX90 (2024–present)
- Polestar 3 (2024–present)

=== Future ===
- Volvo XC60 (2026–to commence)
- Volvo XC90 (2028–to commence)

=== Former ===
- Volvo S60 (2018–2024)
