= Volvo Car Manufacturing Malaysia =

Car manufacturer

Volvo Car Manufacturing Malaysia Sdn. Bhd. (VCMM)
- Industry: Automotive
- Founded: September 1966
- Headquarters: Shah Alam, Malaysia
- Area served: Southeast Asia and Taiwan
- Products: Volvo Cars
- Number of employees: 500
- Parent: Volvo Car Corporation (100%)

Volvo Car Manufacturing Malaysia
- Interactive map of the Volvo Car Manufacturing Malaysia area

Volvo Car Manufacturing Malaysia Sdn. Bhd. (VCMM) is a wholly owned subsidiary of Sweden-based Volvo Car Corporation. The company was established in September 1966 through a joint venture between AB Volvo and the Federal Auto Company Sdn. Bhd..

Volvo Car Manufacturing Malaysia operates a vehicle assembly plant in Shah Alam which produces Volvo passenger cars for domestic and export markets. The 50-year-old^{(as of 2016)} VCMM plant is the oldest automobile assembly plant in Malaysia, and is widely credited as one of the pioneers of the Malaysian automotive industry.

Volvo Car Manufacturing Malaysia was previously known as Swedish Motor Assemblies Sdn. Bhd. (SMA) between 1966 and 2012. From 2013 onwards, the company changed its name to Volvo Car Manufacturing Malaysia.

== History ==
Volvo's history in Malaysia dates back to the early 1960s. Four businessmen from Penang had travelled to Volvo's establishment in Sweden to propose plans to market Volvo cars in Malaysia. Volvo granted the group the distributorship rights, and the Federal Auto Company Sdn. Bhd. was founded in March 1960. The first Volvo cars were imported into Malaysia in that same month. Initially, sales were slow-paced, but by 1966, Volvo cars had gained a good reputation in Malaysia, while Federal Auto had expanded their network throughout West Malaysia and Singapore.

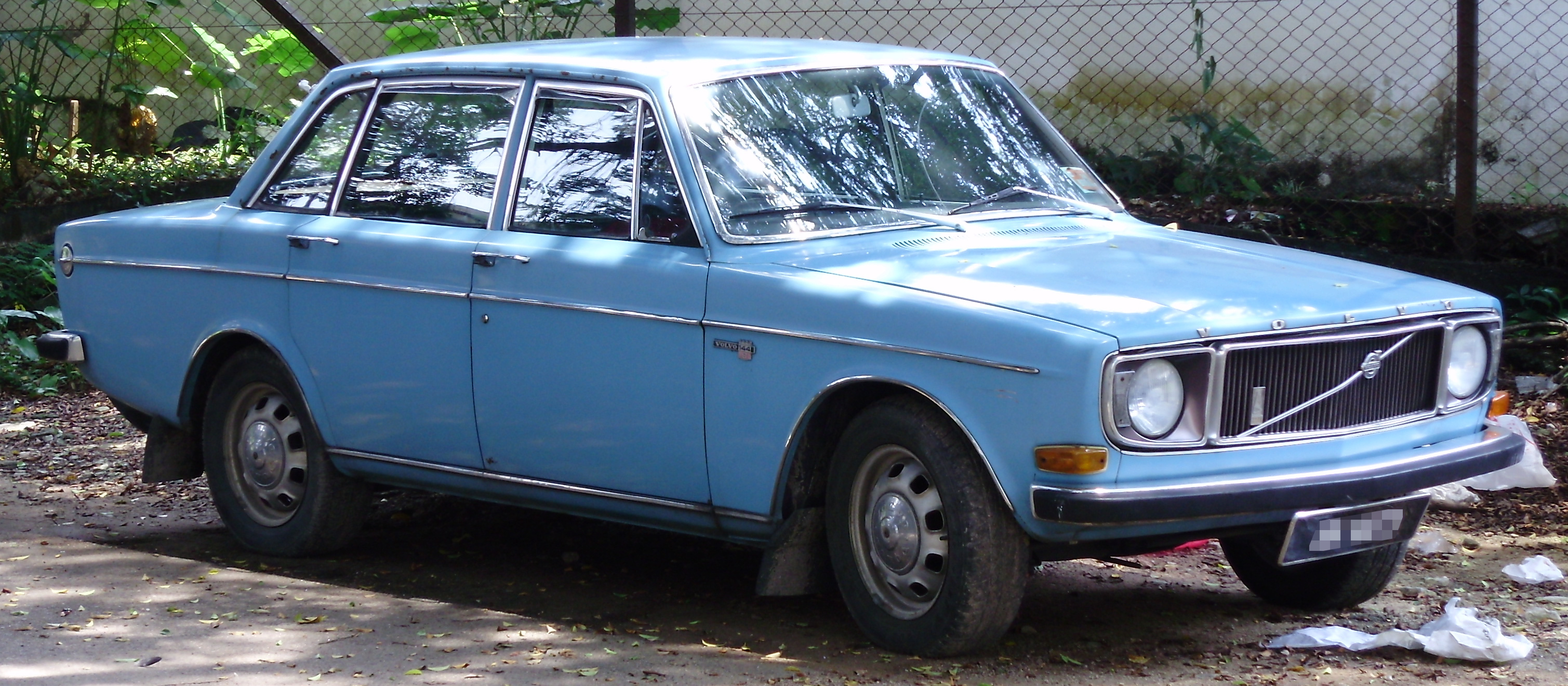
The Volvo 144 became the debut model for the Swedish Motor Assemblies plant.

In September 1966, Swedish Motor Assemblies Sdn. Bhd. (SMA) was established as a joint venture on a 50/50 basis between Volvo and Federal Auto. SMA was established in response to a government-proposed initiative to set up an automotive industry in Malaysia. Foreign and local companies were granted licences and incentives to facilitate local assembly of vehicles and manufacturing of vehicle components. Volvo was one of nineteen firms which expressed interest in the project.

Construction of the Swedish Motor Assemblies plant commenced in March 1967 in an industrial estate in Batu Tiga, near Shah Alam. Construction was hampered by the 1967 Suez crisis and other issues, but was completed on schedule in October 1967. The Volvo 144 became the first model to roll-off the SMA assembly line in November 1967. The Minister of Transport, Sardon Jubir, test drove the first Malaysian-assembled Volvo the following month. The Minister of Commerce and Industry, Lim Swee Aun, officially opened the Swedish Motor Assemblies plant on 17 February 1968.

The Swedish Motor Assemblies plant is widely credited as the 'first automobile assembly plant in Malaysia'. However, SMA was preceded by Singapore-based Ford Motor Company of Malaya (Ford Malaya), which began local assembly operations in November 1926. In April 1941, Ford Malaya built Southeast Asia's first fully-fledged automobile assembly plant in Bukit Timah, Singapore. The plant was later renamed the Ford Motor Company of Malaysia (Ford Malaysia), and briefly became Malaysia's oldest automobile assembly plant when Singapore was part of Malaysia (September 1963 – August 1965). Additionally, Kelang Pembena Kereta-Kereta (KPKK) had commenced Fiat car assembly in August 1967 at their all-new assembly plant in Tampoi, Johor, three months ahead of Swedish Motor Assemblies. However, the official opening of the KPKK plant took place on 26 February 1968, nine days after SMA's official opening. Nonetheless, both Ford and Fiat assembly plants have since shut down, while the Volvo plant has survived and remains active today.

As a better-equipped model from 1984, there were also the Volvo 240. In the mid-nineties, the Volvo S40 and its wagon version Volvo V40 were introduced. With the takeover by Ford, SMA also began manufacturing Land Rover Defenders. From 1999 until the spring of 2010 the plant was part of Ford Motor Company.

The first model of the new millennium in 2001 came the luxurious Volvo S60 added. This Volvo ran into the Malaysian market for the first time in the upper middle class. Two years later, it was followed by the Volvo S80 and SUV Volvo XC90. In 2004, after all, the S40 was replaced by its second generation. The combined Volvo V50 was only added in the following year. In July 2006, the coupe-convertible Volvo C70 debuted. In 2008 it was followed by the Volvo C30. The old S80, which still was manufactured here in the first generation. With the new joint venture Indobuana Autoraya, this model was exported to Jakarta, Indonesia. The replacement came in April 2010 as the second generation of the Volvo S80.

Up to 6000 units per year are manufactured in the Malaysian plant, with approximately 500 employees working in two shifts. The site comprises a total area of 25,000 square metres (270,000 sq ft). Distribution of vehicles is handled by the in-house sales organisation, Volvo Car Malaysia Sdn. Bhd.. The vehicles assembled here have vehicle identification number (VIN), with the eleventh position of the assembly plant, a "5". SMA also built parts for Volvo AB and Renault Trucks SAS Truck Commercial.

As of Q1 2016, only the V40, V60, S60 and XC60 remain in production. Production of the first generation XC90 ceased in September 2014, while the last S80 unit rolled off the line in August 2015.

Volvo Car Manufacturing Malaysia commenced local assembly of the second generation XC90 in May 2016, making it the first plug-in hybrid electric vehicle (PHEV) to be assembled in Malaysia. The locally assembled (CKD) XC90 T8 Twin Engine was formally launched on 1 June 2016, approximately six months after the debut of the fully imported (CBU) XC90. VCMM's 59-year-old Shah Alam plant is the first and currently only plant to assemble the new XC90 outside Sweden. Volvo had greatly invested in the plant's infrastructure to handle to the company's new Scalable Product Architecture (SPA) platform. The locally assembled XC90 was granted EEV status and significant tax exemptions, allowing it to be priced well under its fully imported, non-hybrid/EV competitors. In terms of specifications, the CKD XC90 is almost identical to the CBU XC90, with differences being limited to paint options and other cosmetic changes. VCM will export the new Malaysian-assembled XC90 to neighbouring Thailand, and the company has also announced plans to assemble the upcoming S90 in the near future.

Local assembly of the new Volvo S90 commenced in June 2017. VCMM currently assembles two variants of the S90, namely the T8 Twin Engine plug-in hybrid and D4 Momentum diesel respectively. In August 2017, VCMM began exporting both Malaysian-assembled S90 models to Thailand.

== Current models ==
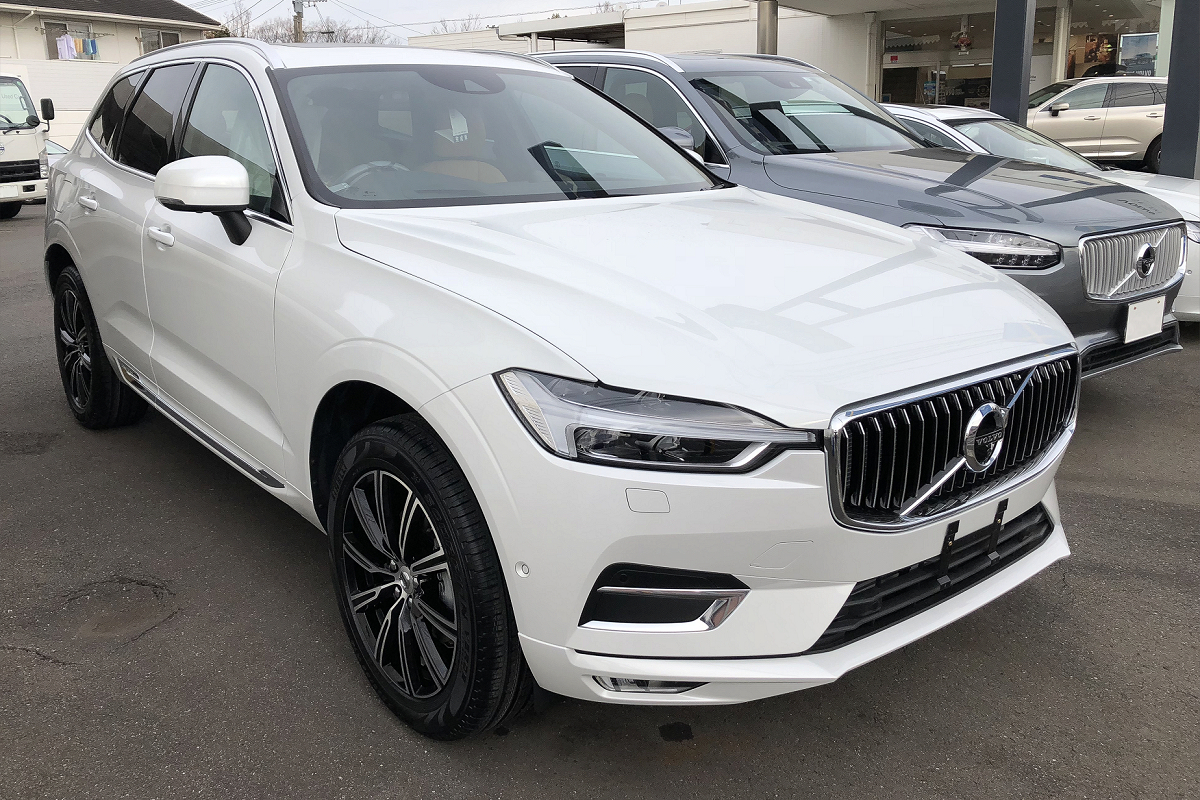
Volvo XC60

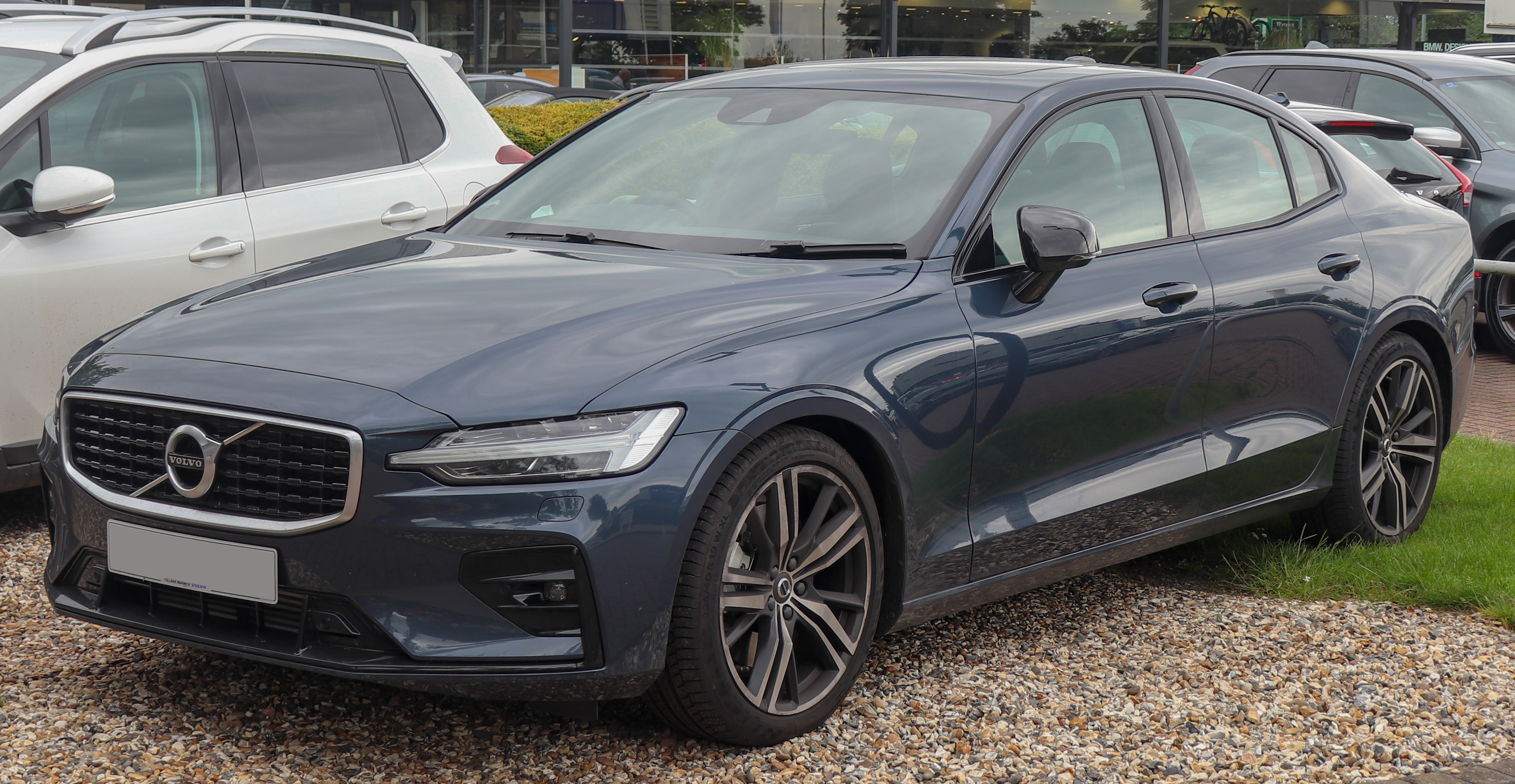
Volvo S60

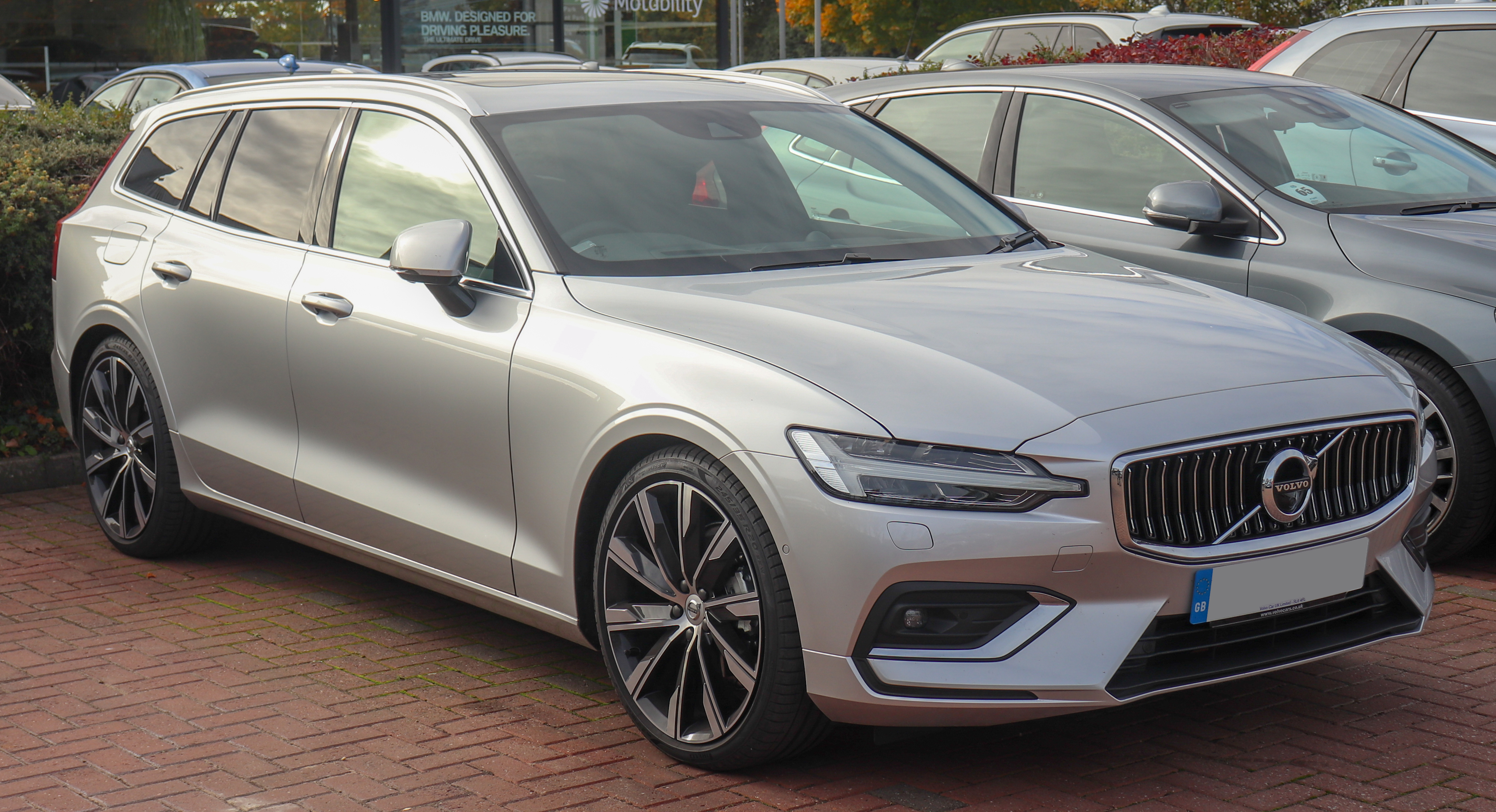
Volvo V60

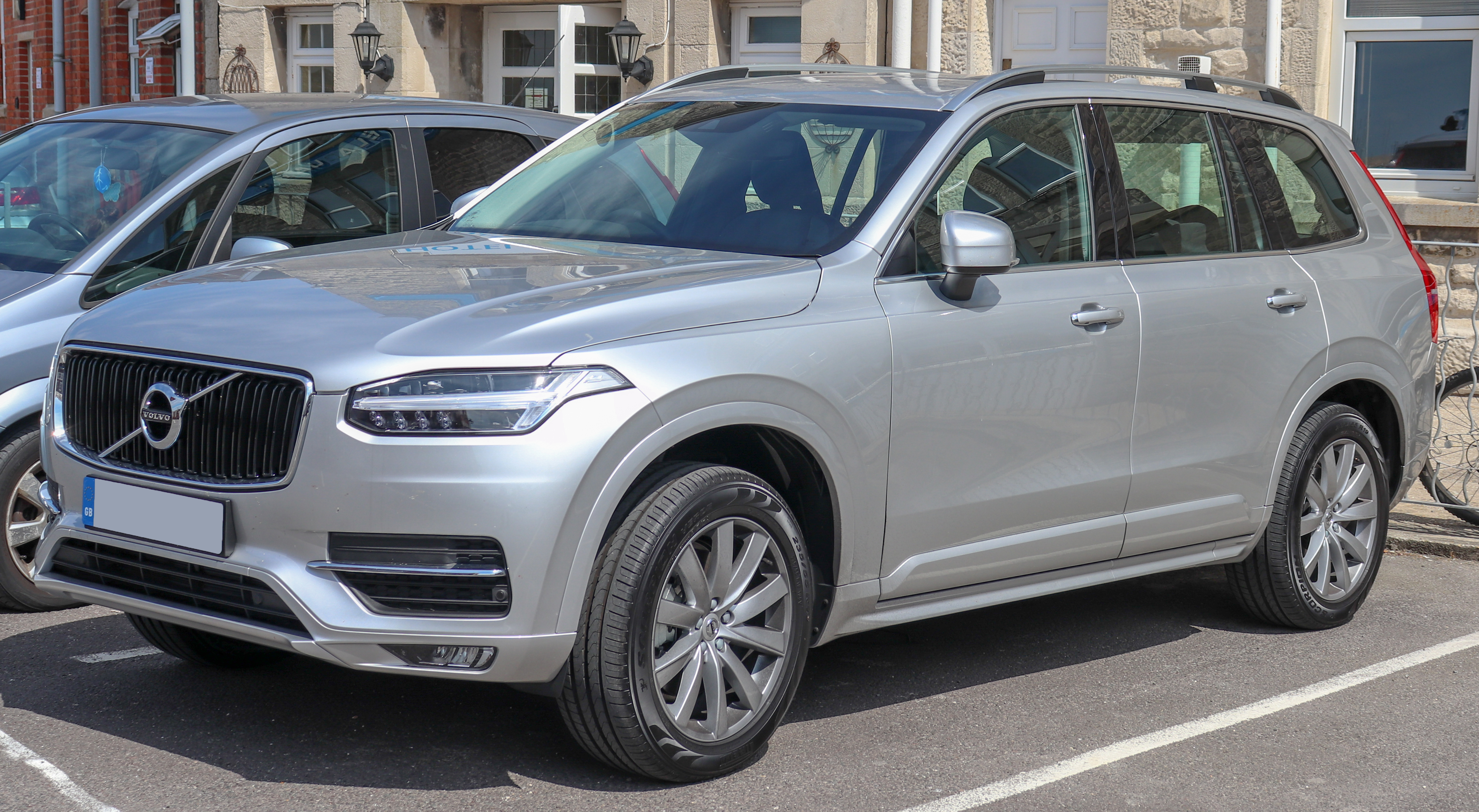
Volvo XC90

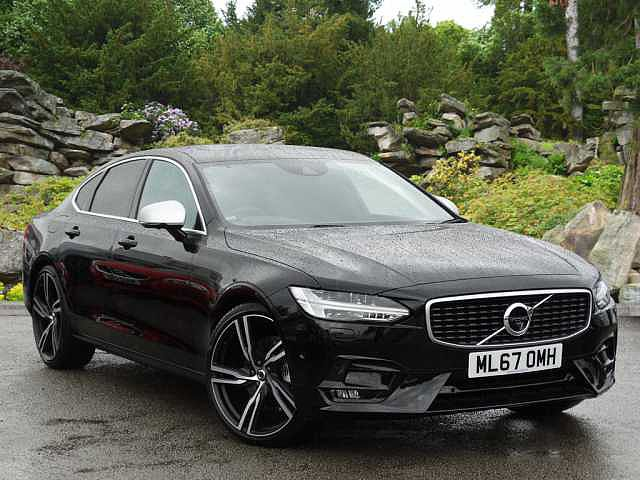
Volvo S90

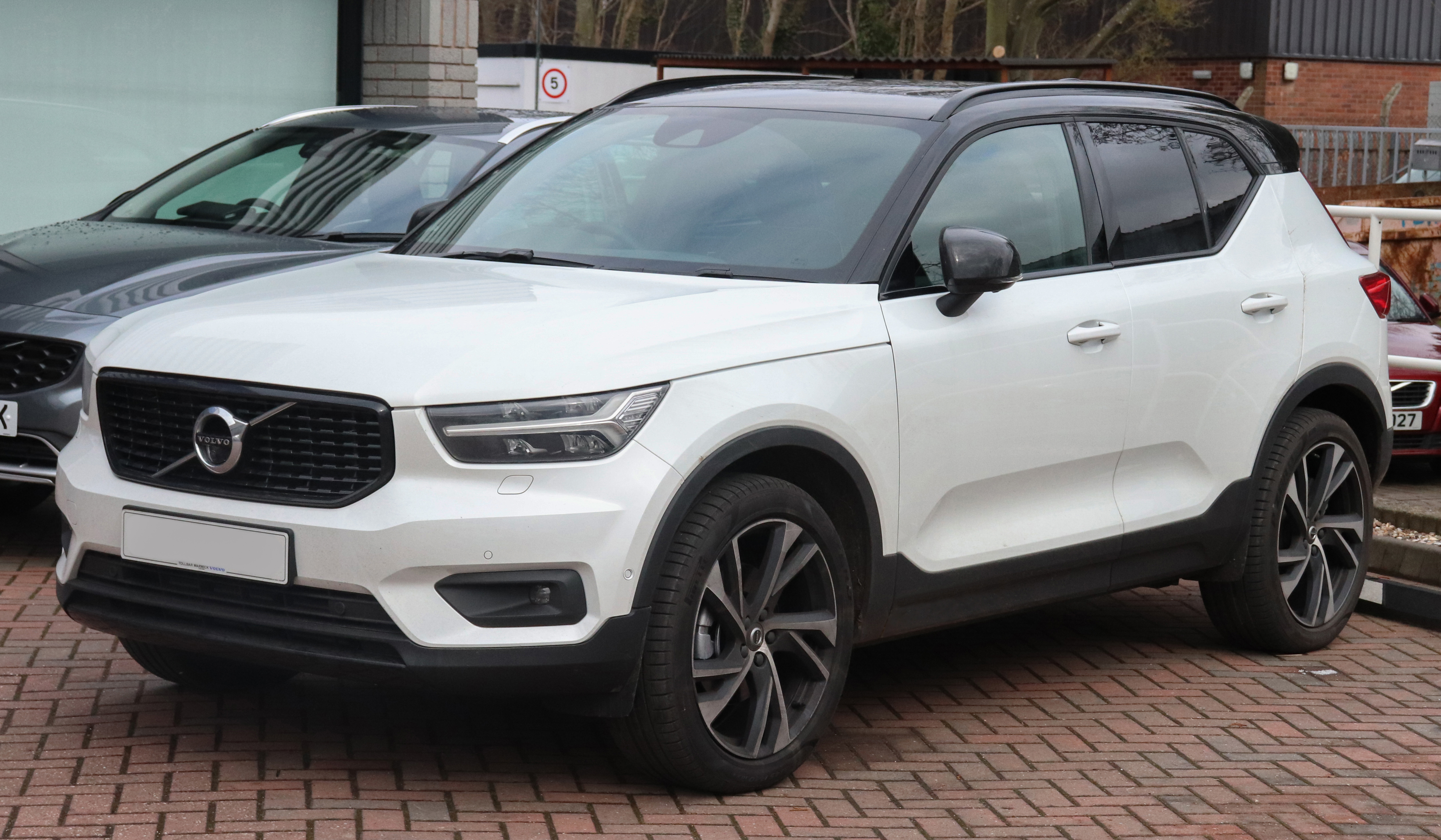
Volvo XC40

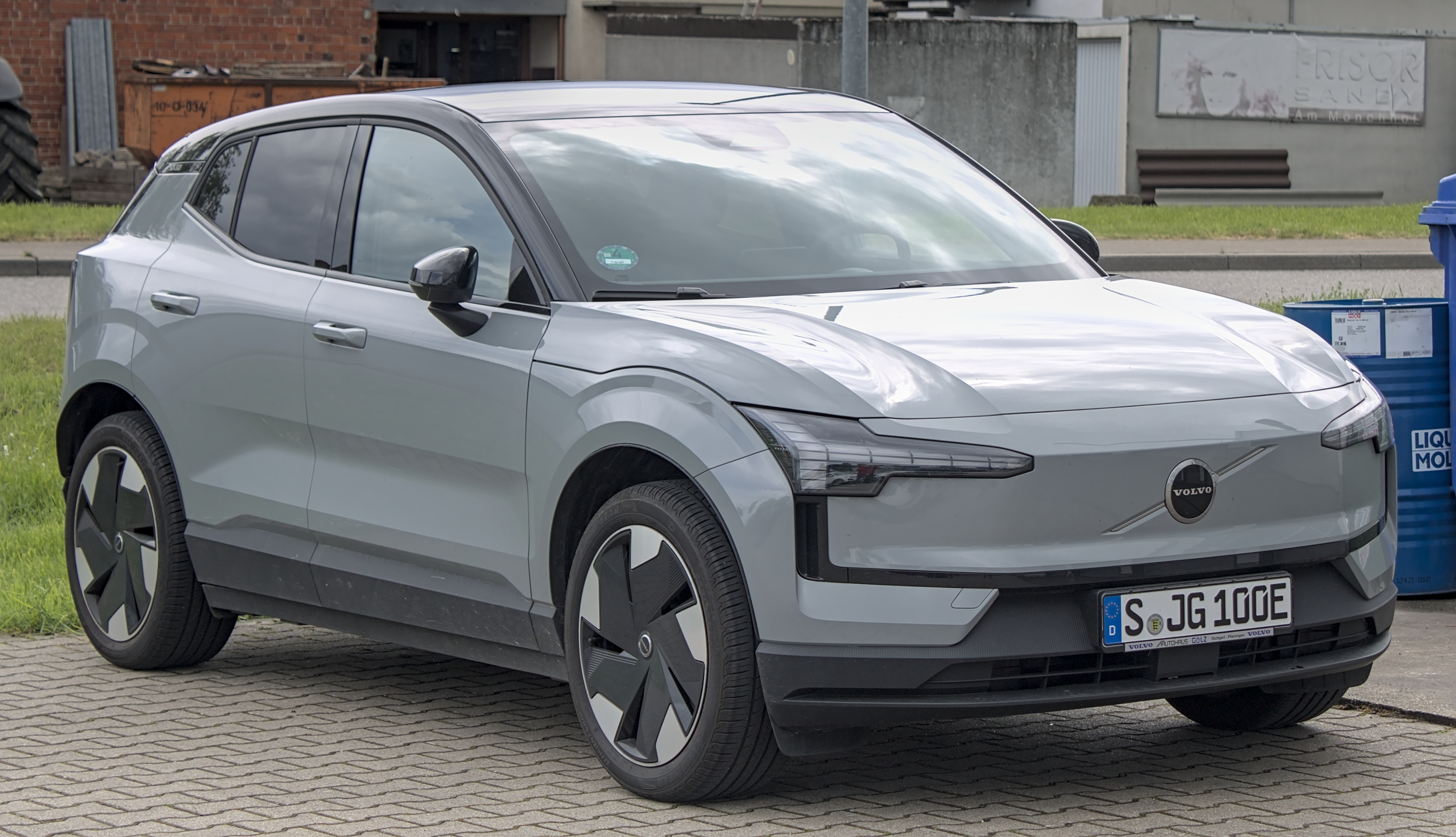
Volvo EX30

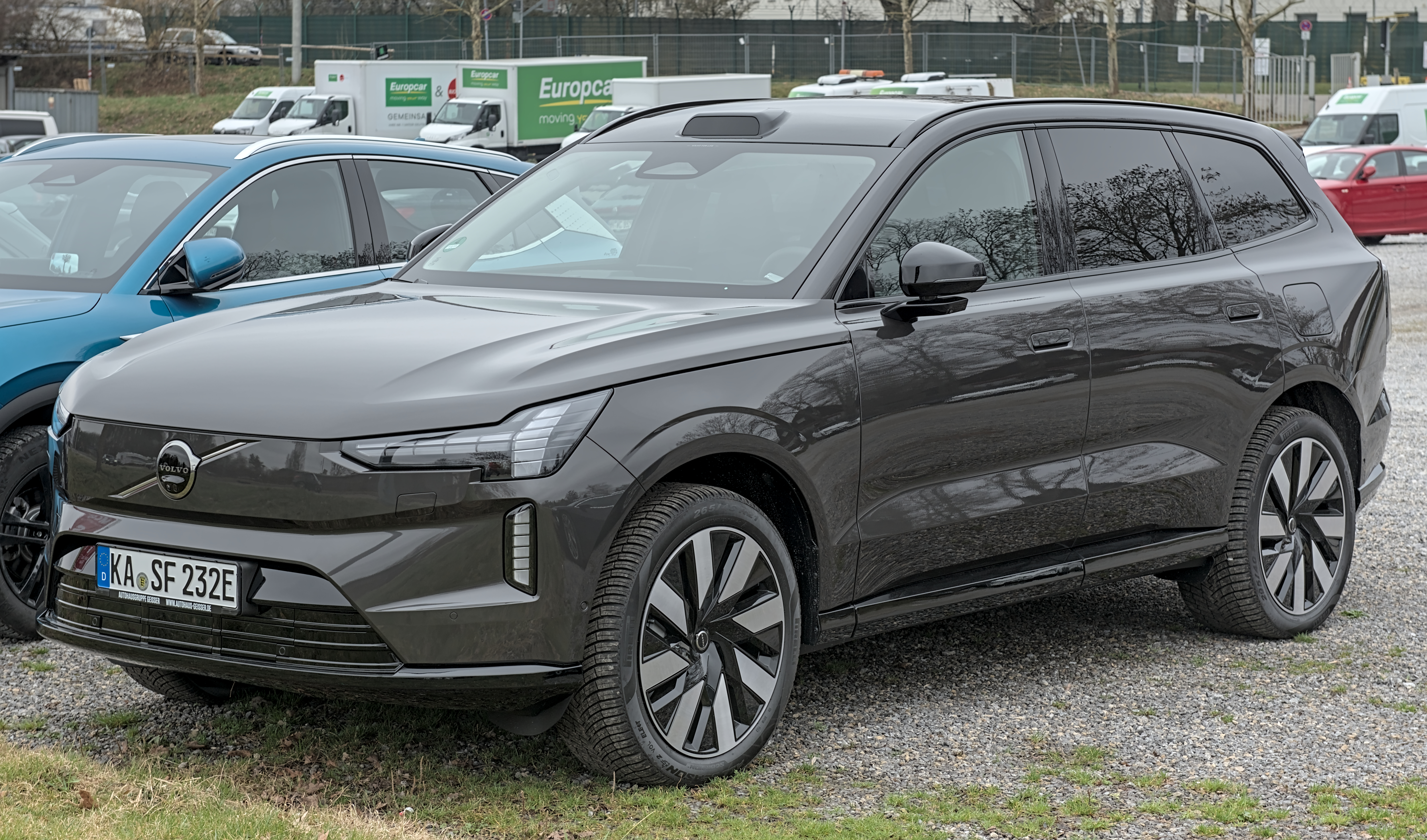
Volvo EX90

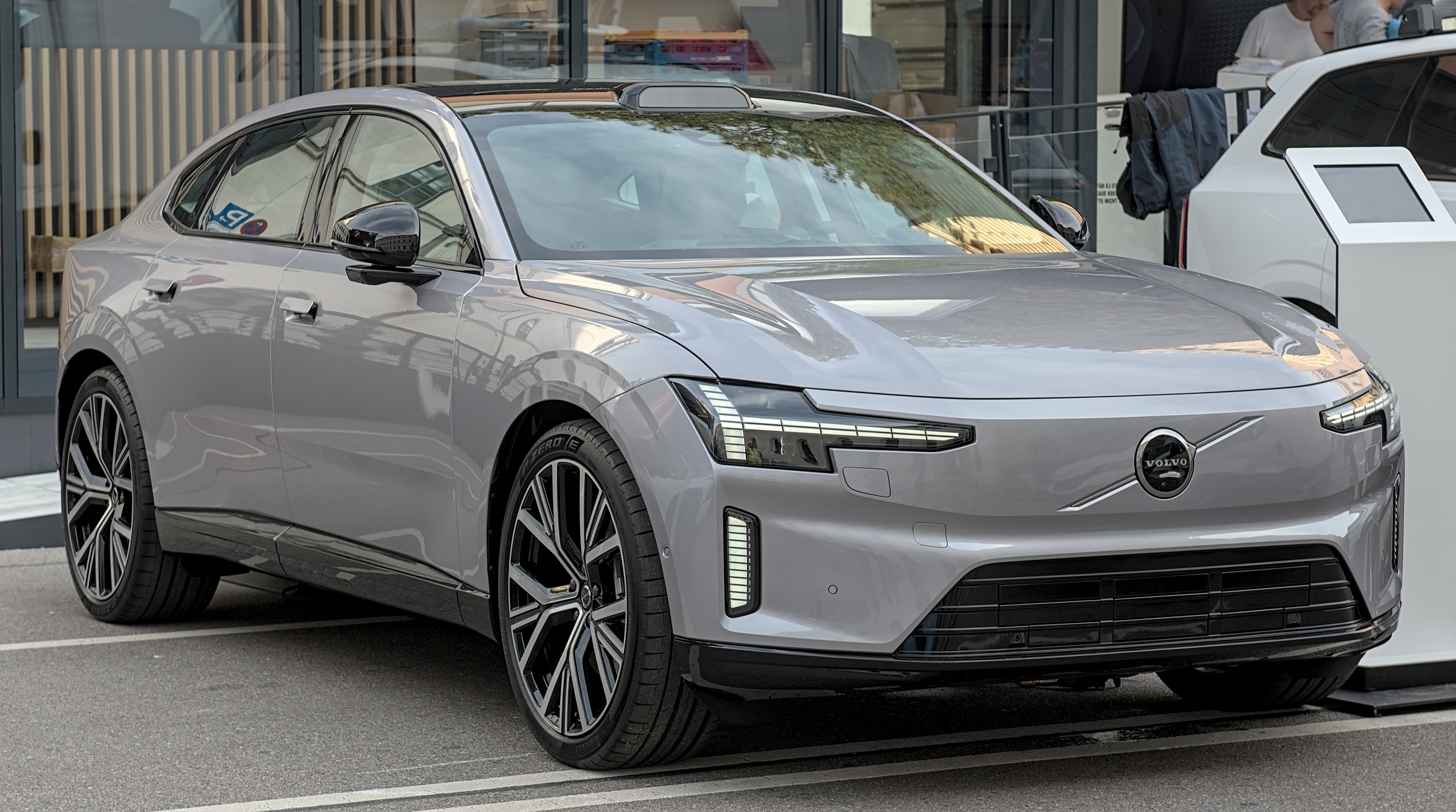
Volvo ES90

== Former models ==
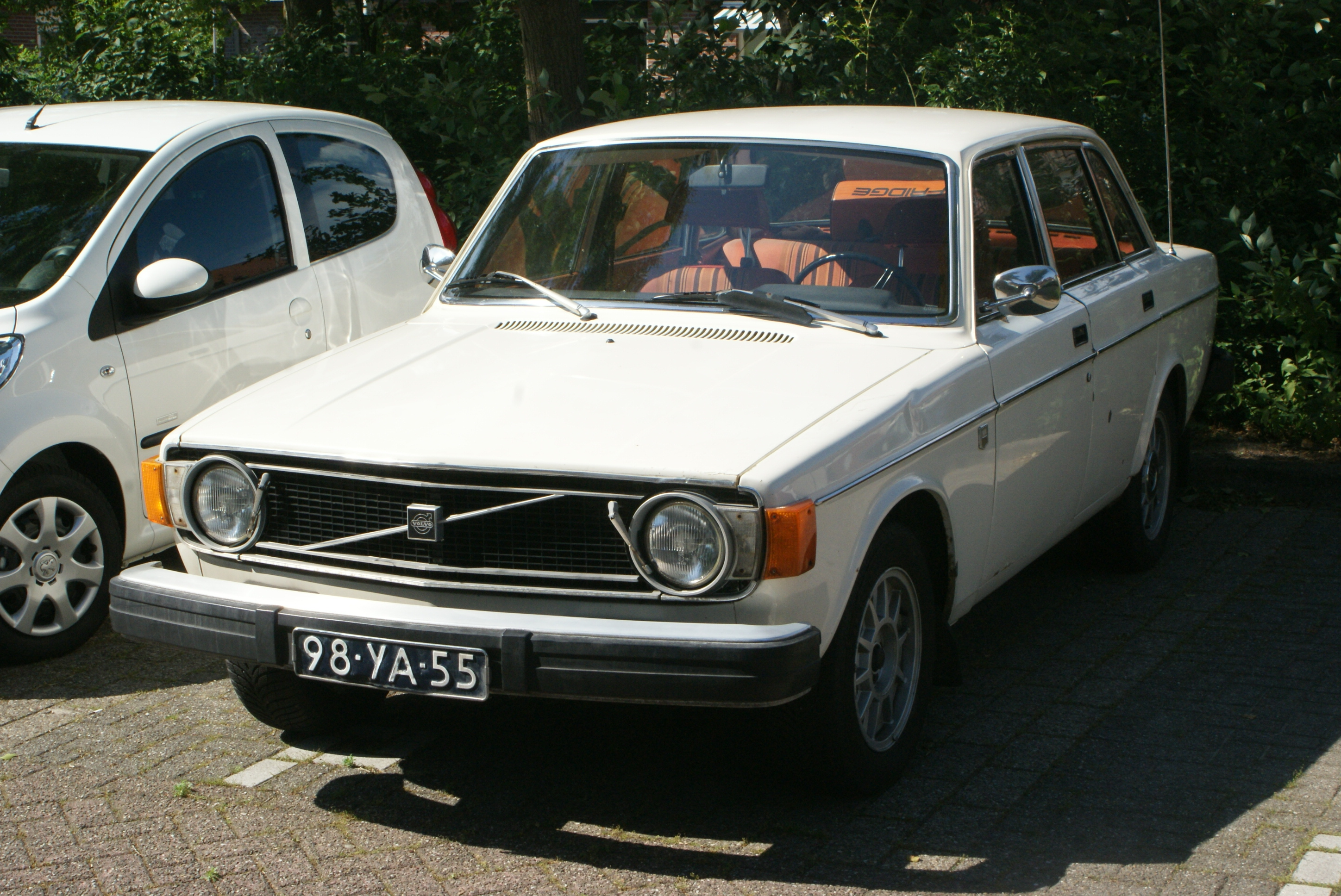
Volvo 144
1968–1974

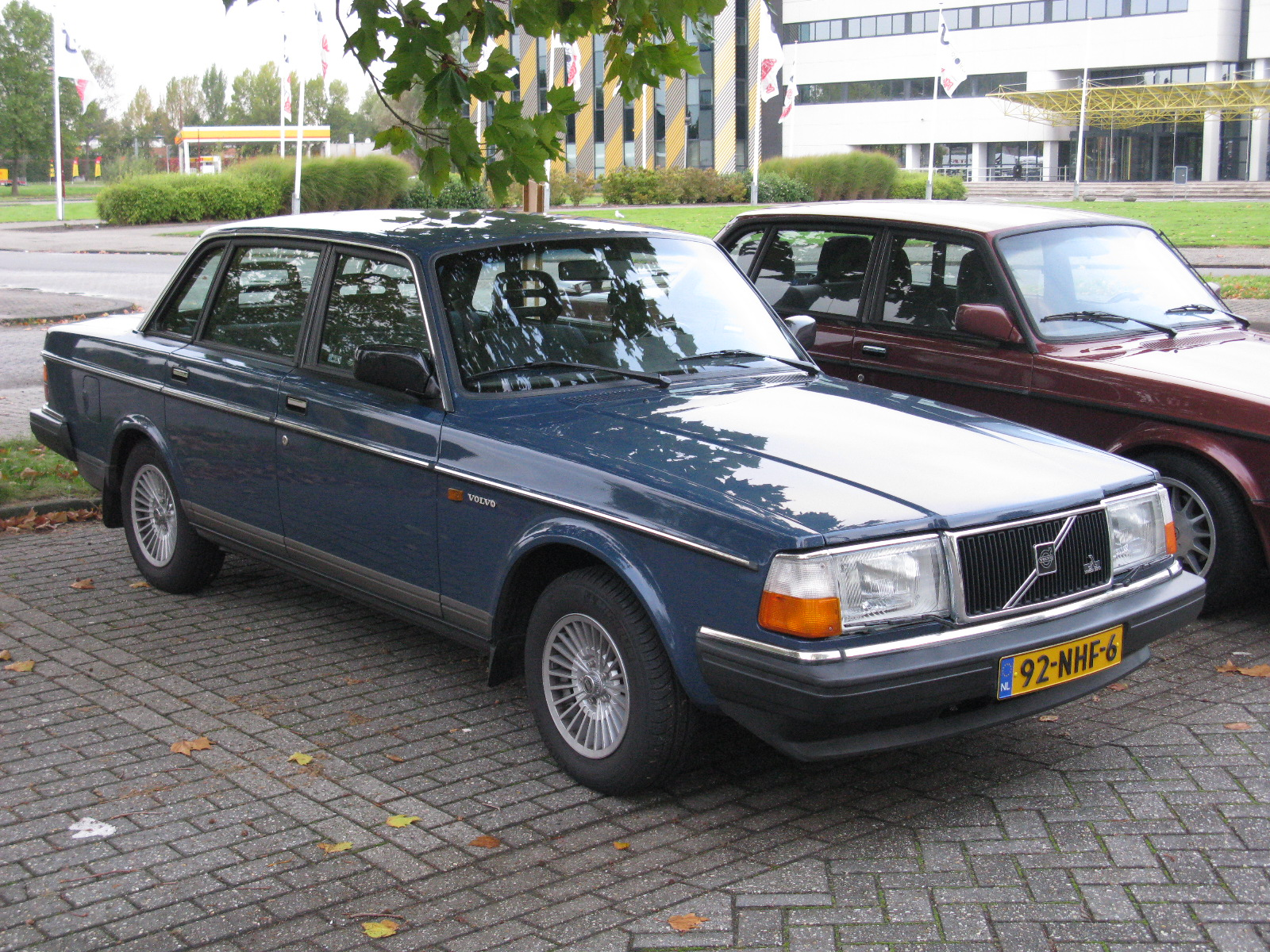
Volvo 240
1984–1994

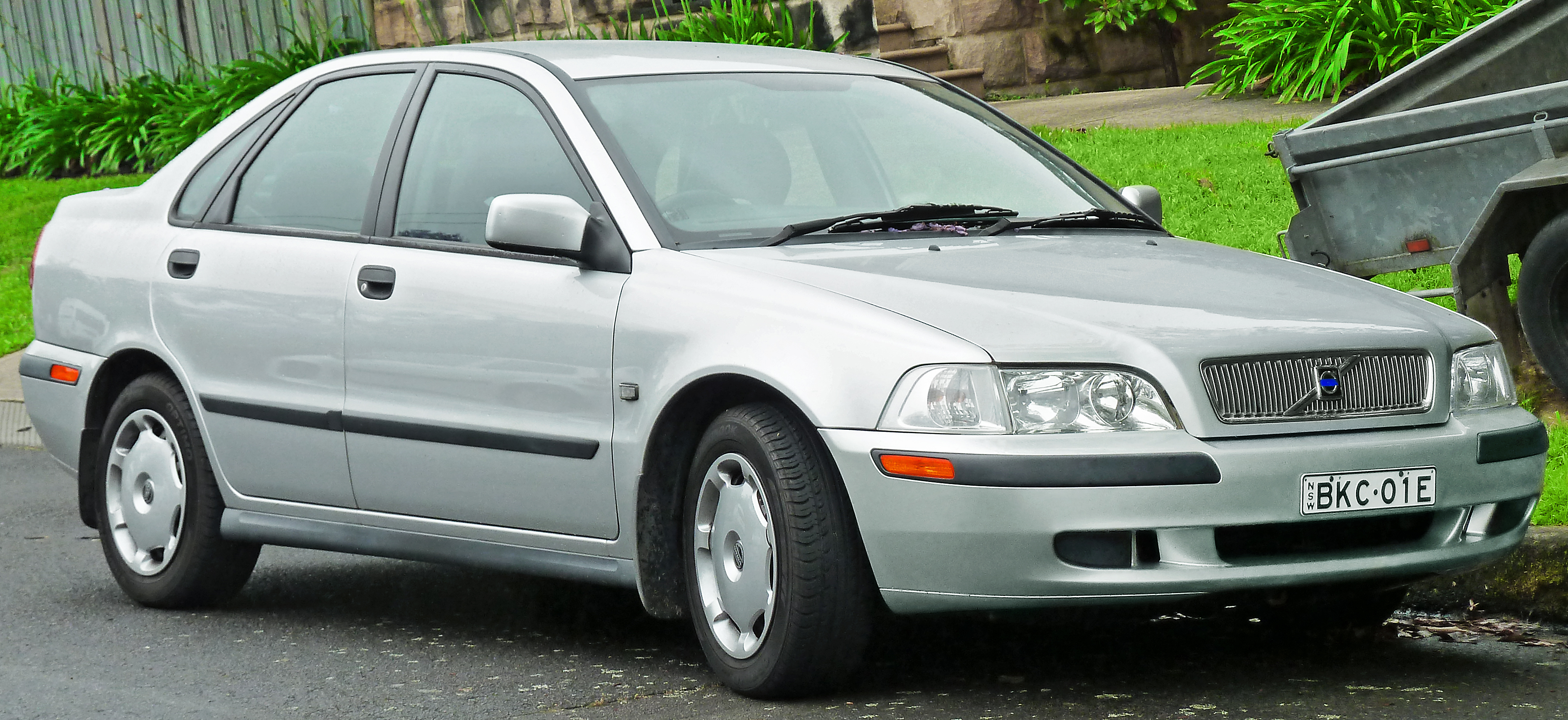
Volvo S40
1996–2004

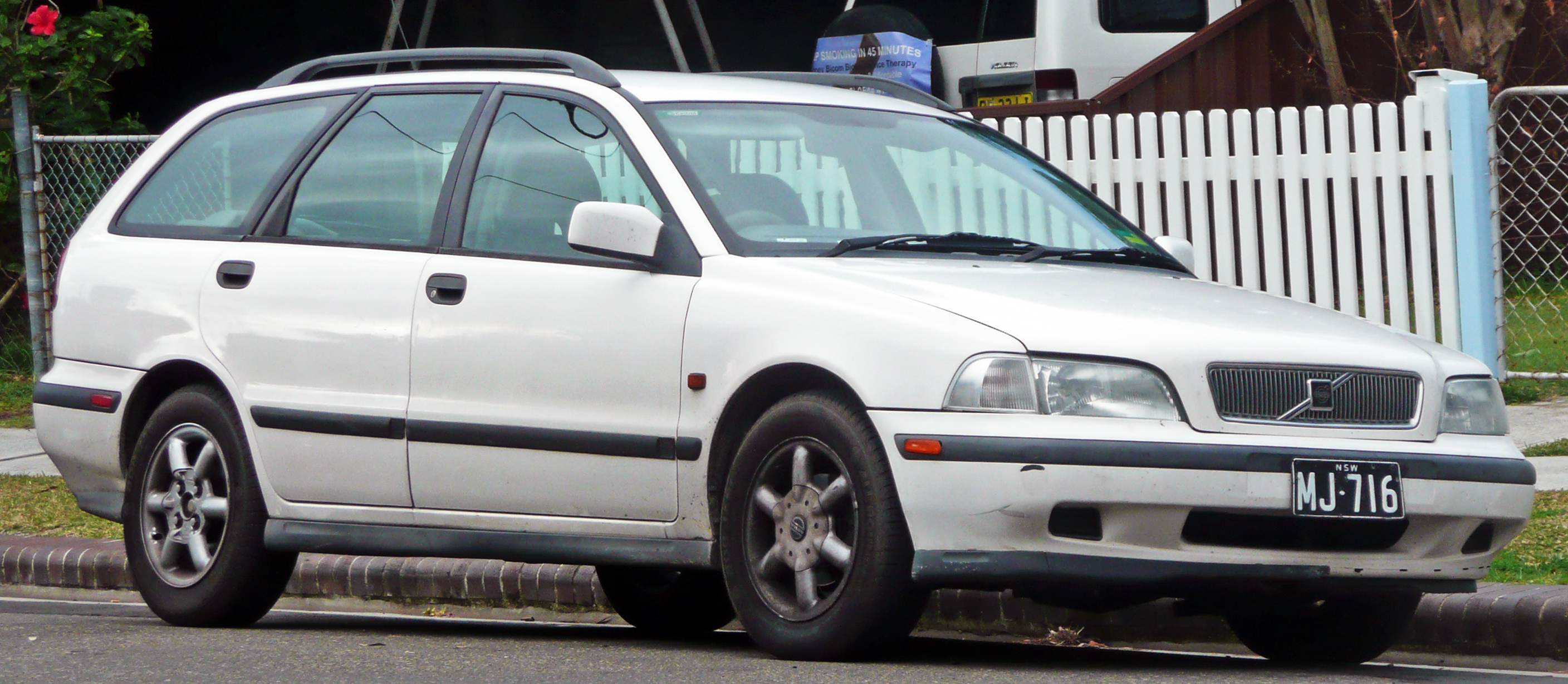
Volvo V40
1996–2004

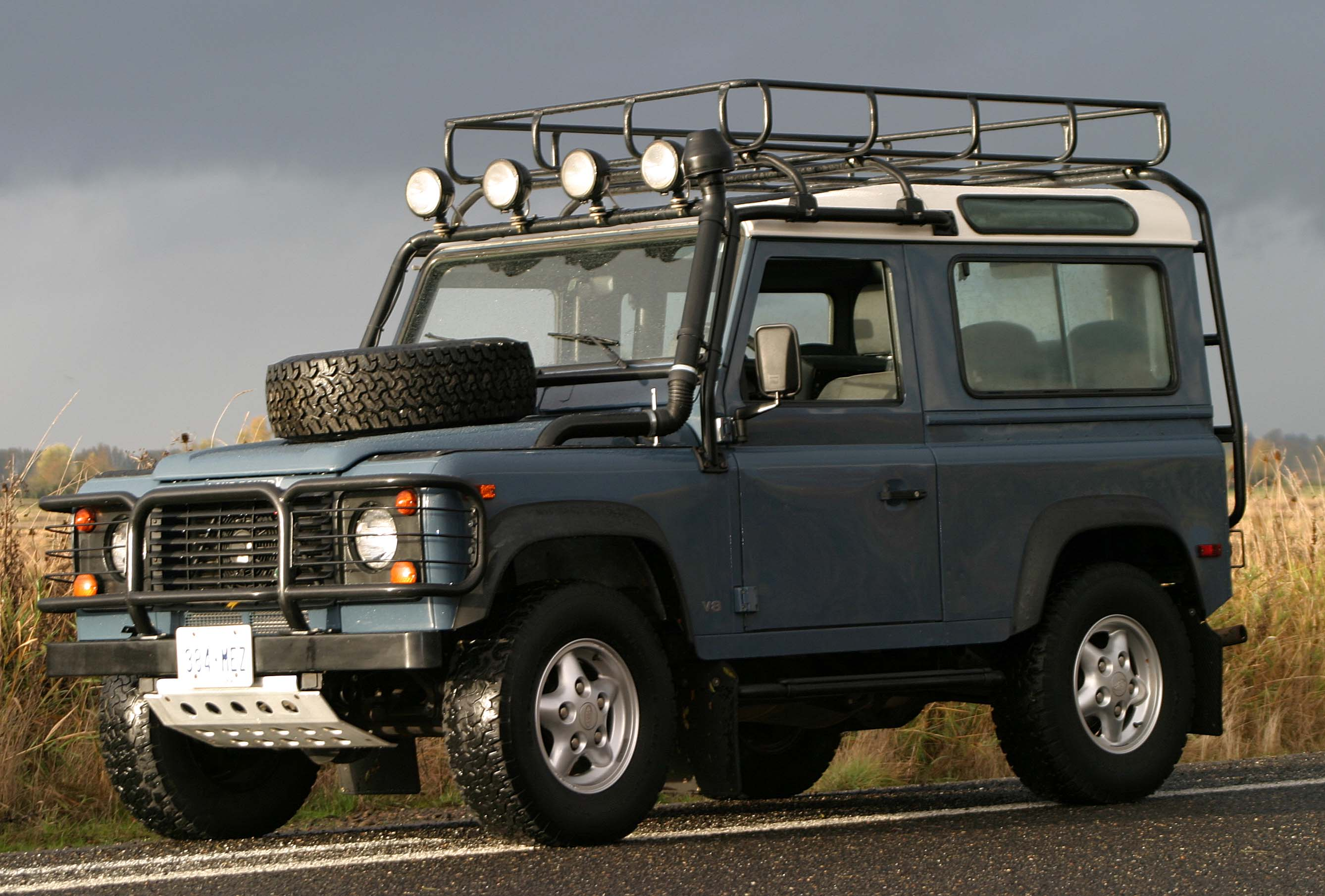
Land Rover Defender 90
1999–2010

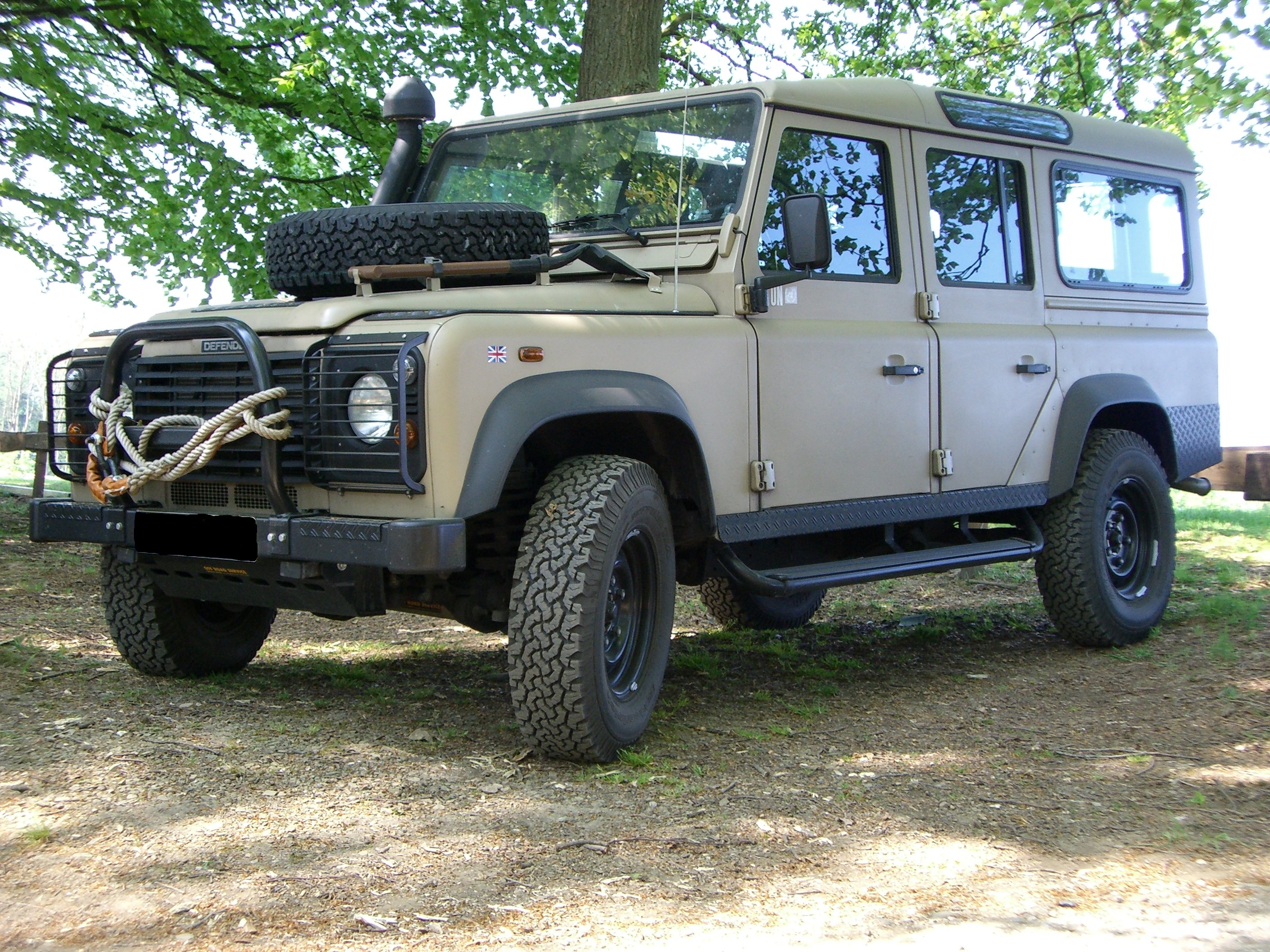
Land Rover Defender 110
1999–2010

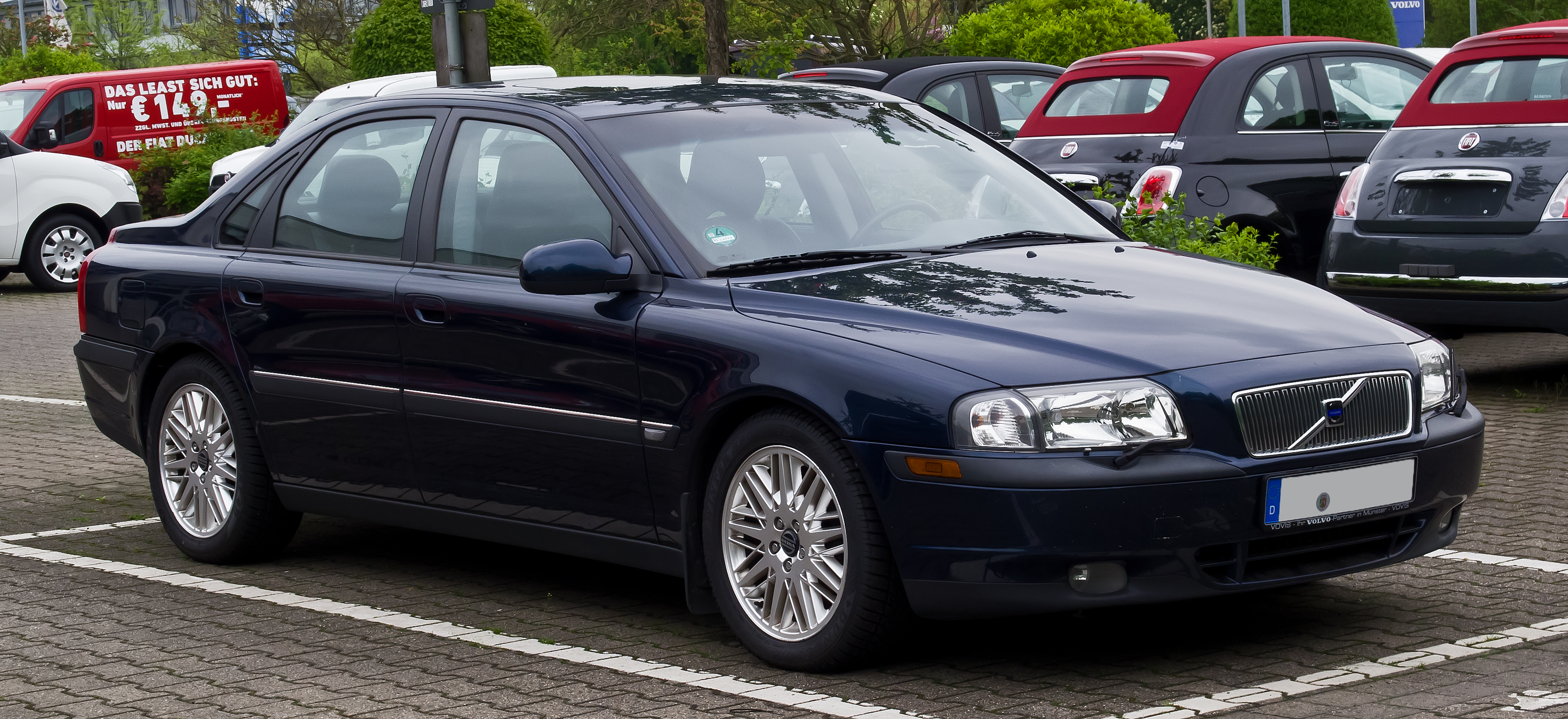
Volvo S80
2000–09/2009

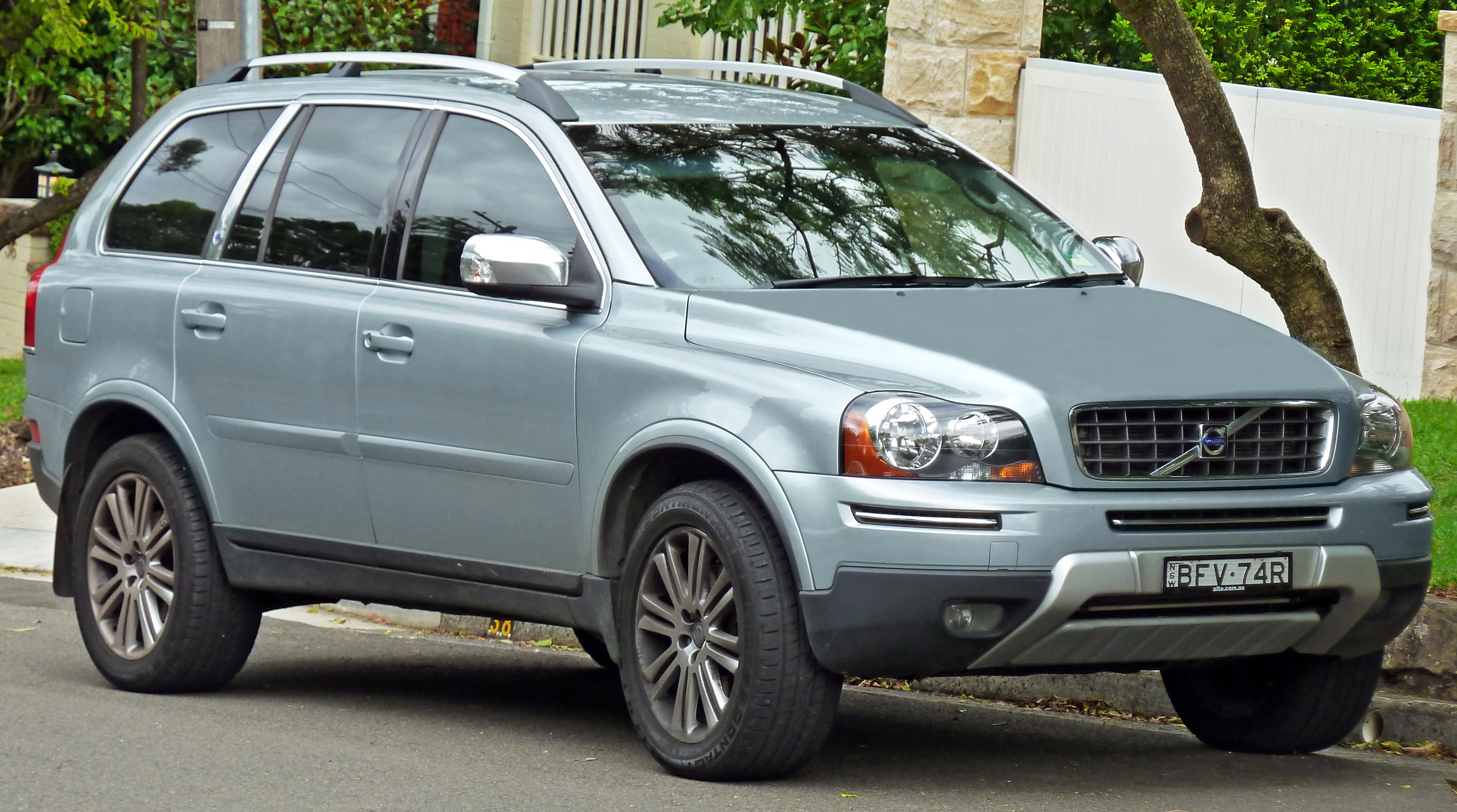
Volvo XC90
2003–09/2014

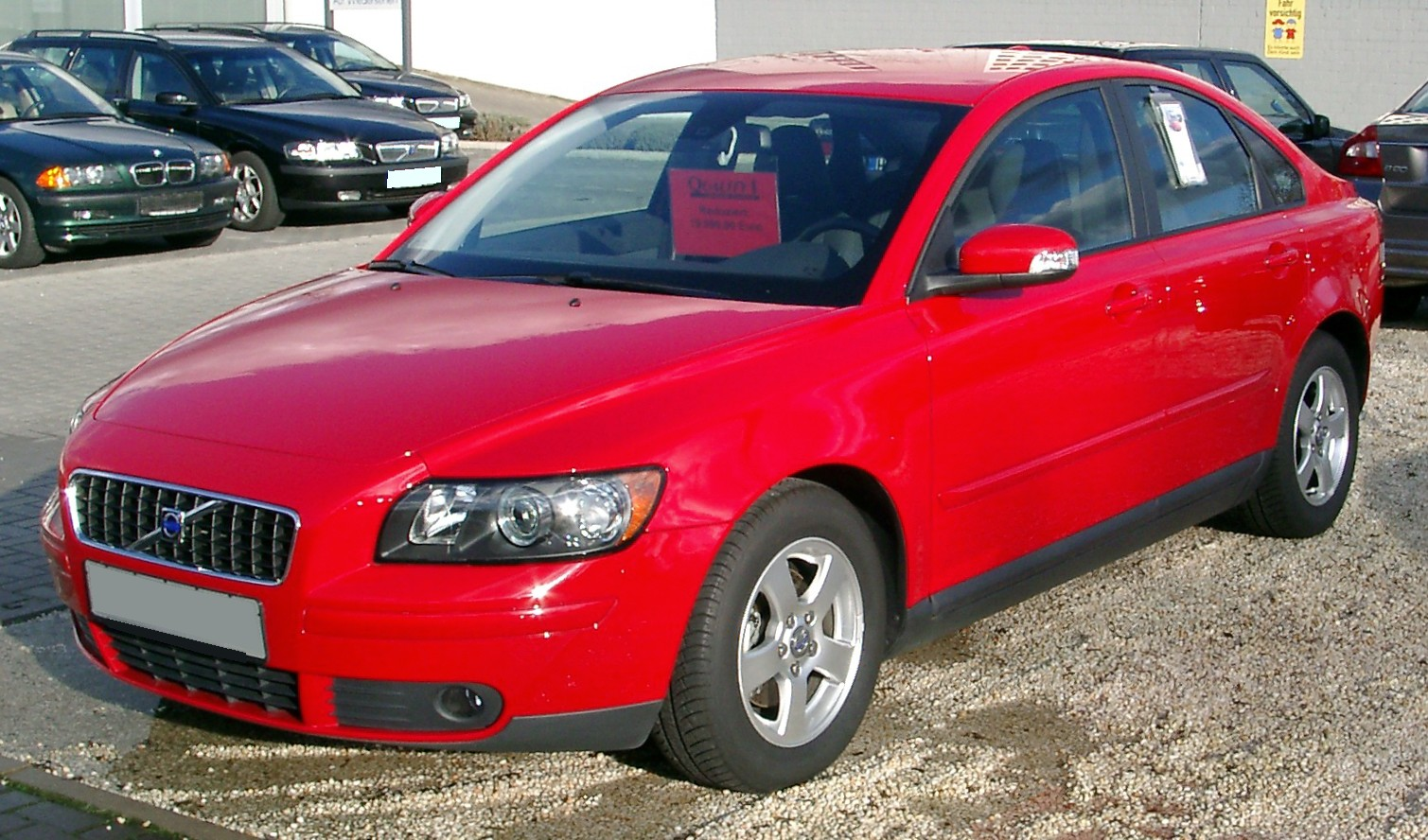
Volvo S40
2004–11/2012

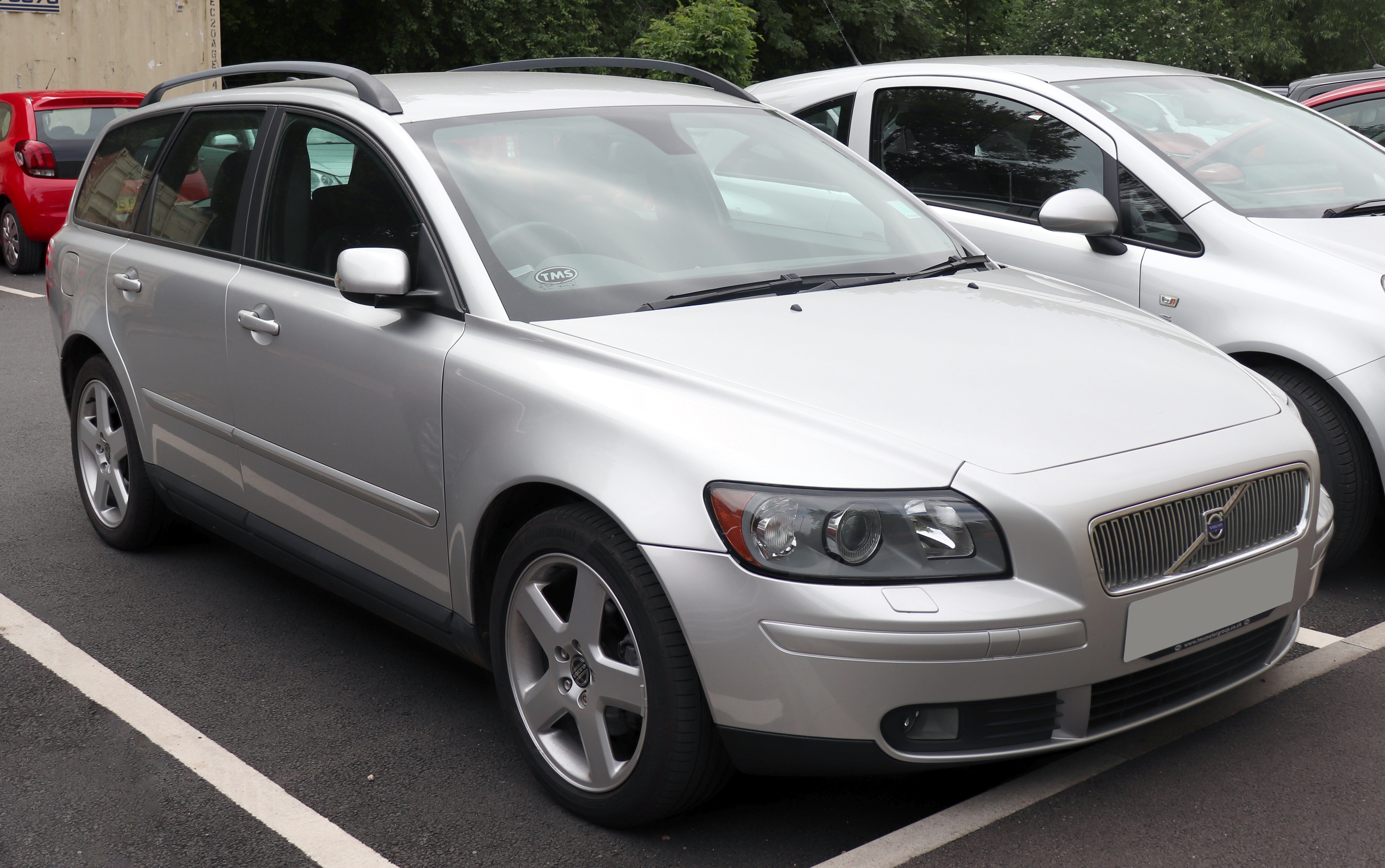
Volvo V50
2005–02/2013

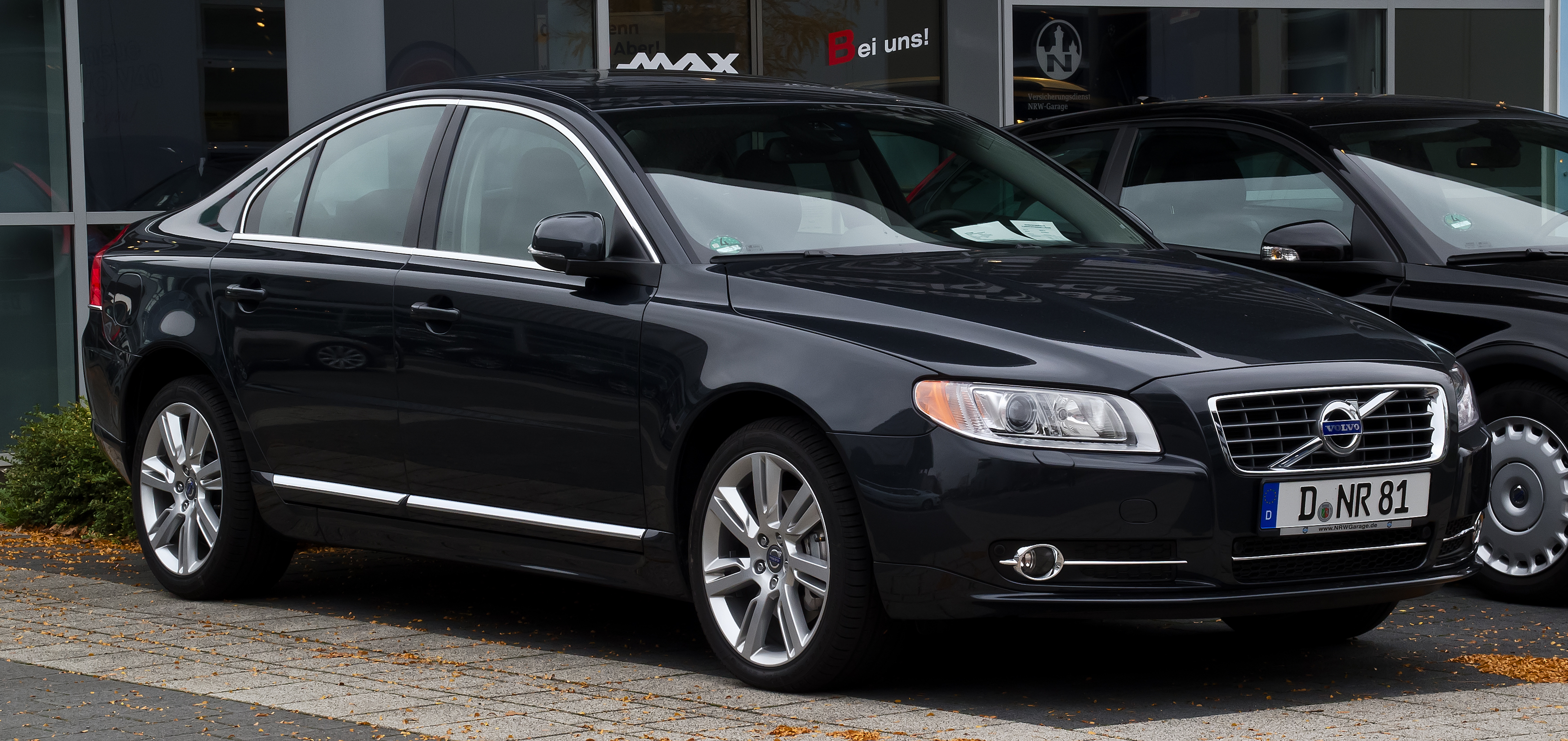
Volvo S80
04/2010–08/2015

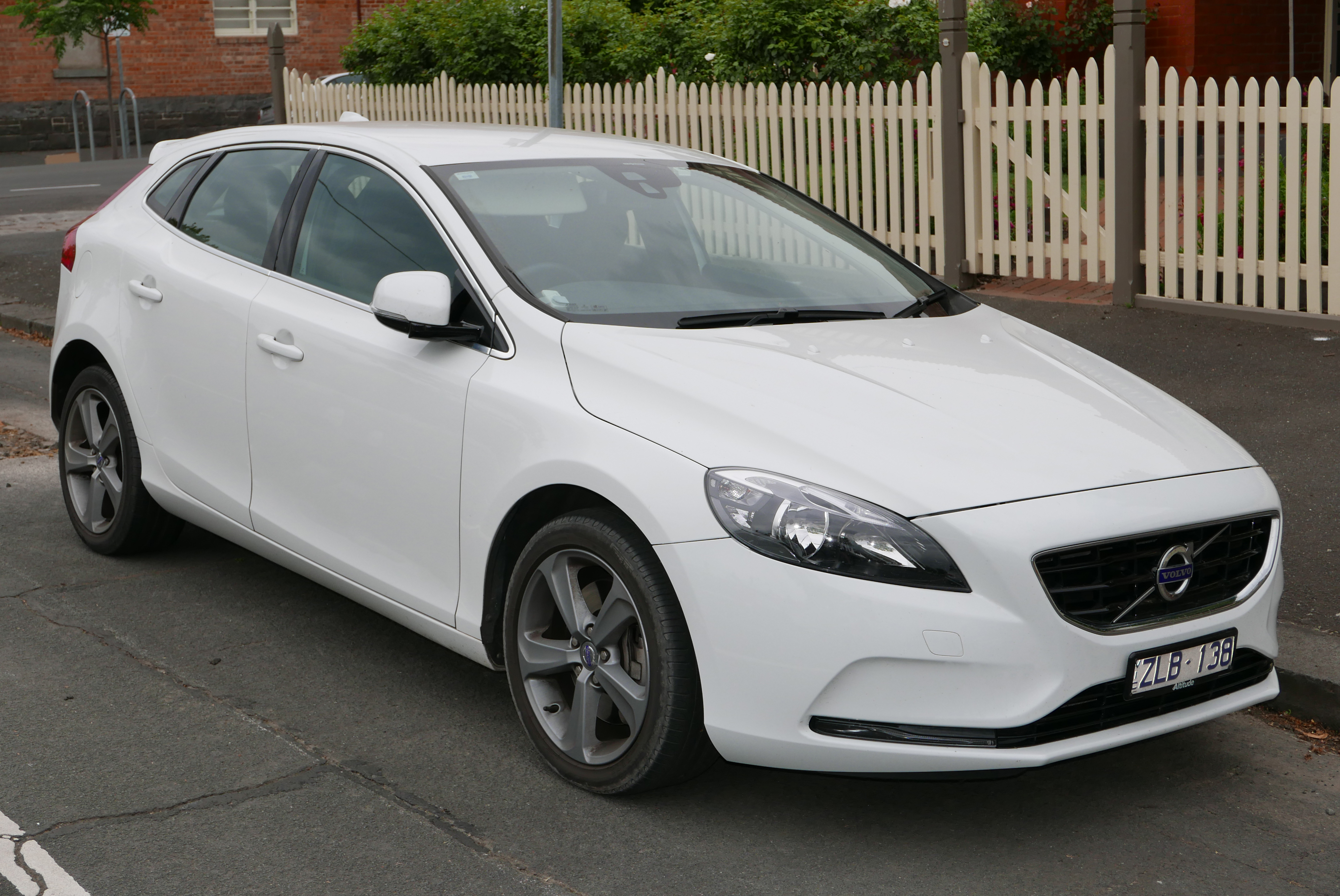
Volvo V40
2012–2019

== Production figures ==
Swedish Motor Assemblies (SMA) production figures between 2009 and Q1 2016
Model	Total	Q1 2016	2015	2014	2013	2012	2011	2010	2009
Volvo S80	928		88	124	226	198	148	120	24
Volvo XC90	696			149	156	144	96	91	60
Volvo S40	906					84	277	383	162
Volvo V50	792				1	144	309	302	36
Volvo XC60	3,194	48	740	391	531	803	563	118	
Volvo S60	1,788	24	72	273	458	681	280		
Volvo V60	1,212	0	168	111	407	459	67		
Volvo V40	2,052	76	500	917	559				
Total produced	11,568	148	1,568	1,965	2,338	2,513	1,740	1,014	282
Notes: Q1 2016 applies for units sold in January, February & March 2016 only. Total applies for model-specific units produced since beginning of production or January 2009 and cessation of production or March 2016 only (whichever applicable). Total produced applies for all model units produced between January 2009 and March 2016 only.
