= Volvo EX90 =

Battery electric full-size luxury crossover SUV

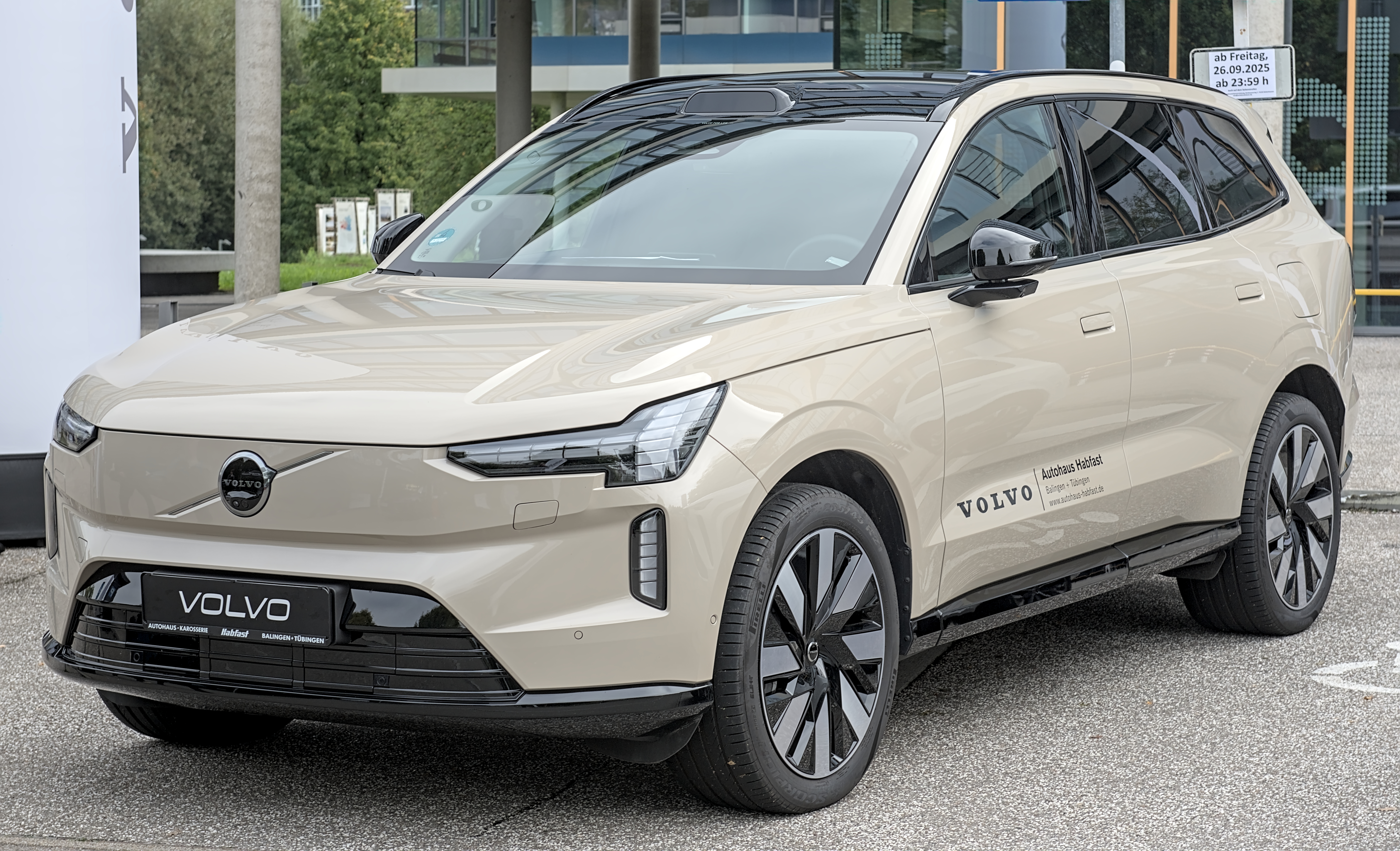

Overview
- Manufacturer: Volvo Cars
- Model code: V536
- Production: May 2024 – present
- Assembly: China: Chengdu (ZAMC); United States: Ridgeville, South Carolina (Volvo Car Charleston Plant); Malaysia: Shah Alam (Volvo Car Manufacturing Malaysia)
- Designer: Robin Page (Head of Design)

Body and chassis
- Class: Full-size luxury crossover SUV
- Body style: 5-door SUV
- Layout: Rear-motor, rear-wheel drive; Dual-motor, all-wheel-drive
- Platform: SPA2 (400V) (2024-2025) SPA2 (800V) (2026+)
- Related: Polestar 3 Volvo ES90

Powertrain
- Electric motor: 2× permanent magnet synchronous
- Power output: 2024-2025 (400V): 208 kW (279 hp; 283 PS) (RWD); 300 kW (402 hp; 408 PS) (AWD); 370 kW (496 hp; 503 PS) (Performance, US); 380 kW (510 hp; 517 PS) (Performance); 2026+ (800V): 245 kW (329 hp; 333 PS) (RWD); 335 kW (449 hp; 455 PS) (AWD); 500 kW (671 hp; 680 PS) (AWD Performance)
- Battery: 2024-2025; 104 kWh (gross), 101 kWh (net) CATL lithium-ion; 111 kWh (gross), 107 kWh (net) CATL lithium-ion; 2026+; 92 kWh (nominal) CATL lithium-ion; 106 kWh (nominal) CATL lithium-ion
- Range: 590–600 km (370–370 mi) (claimed); Up to 745 km (460 mi) (NEDC); Up to 627 km (390 mi) (WLTP)
- Plug-in charging: 11 kW (AC); 250 kW (DC) (2024-2025); 350 kW (DC) (2026+)

Dimensions
- Wheelbase: 2,984 mm (117.5 in)
- Length: 5,037 mm (198.3 in)
- Width: 2,039 mm (80.3 in)
- Height: 1,747 mm (68.8 in)
- Kerb weight: 2,818 kg (6,213 lb)

The Volvo EX90 is a battery electric full-size luxury crossover SUV produced by Volvo since May 2024. A seven-seater luxury car, it is Volvo's flagship full-size SUV. It was revealed in November 2022 as the first bespoke electric vehicle marketed under the Volvo brand.

== Overview ==
Prior to its introduction, the design of the EX90 was previewed by the Volvo Concept Recharge in June 2021. Reports previously indicated the production vehicle would be called the Volvo Embla.

The EX90 features a drag coefficient of 0.29 to improve efficiency. It is powered by the same battery pack as the Polestar 3, a 111 kWh (107 kWh usable) battery produced by CATL. With 250 kW DC charging, it is capable of charging 10–80 per cent in around 30 minutes. It also supports bi-directional charging.

The base model of the EX90 is called the Twin Motor, with a power output of 300 kW (402 hp; 408 PS) and 770 N⋅m (78.5 kg⋅m; 568 lb⋅ft) with a range of around 600 km (373 mi) (WLTP). The higher model is called the Twin Motor Performance, which offers a claimed 590 km (367 mi) of range. The power output is rated at 380 kW (510 hp; 517 PS) for the model designated as 'EE', or 370 kW (496 hp; 503 PS) for the model destined for North America and designated as 'E2'. All models are electronically limited up to 180 km/h (112 mph).

The EX90 is equipped with Lidar technology by Luminar fitted as standard across the range to detect pedestrians up to 250 m (820 ft) away. Combined with 12 ultrasonic sensors, 8 cameras, and 5 radars, the EX90 provide Level 3 autonomous capability. In the interior, the 14.5-inch vertically mounted touchscreen with 5G capability. It utilises the Snapdragon Cockpit Platform by Qualcomm to enable visualisation capabilities of Unreal Engine for the computing power and screen graphics on board the EX90, while the core system is powered by Nvidia Drive AI. The EX90 has seven seats, with What Car? reporting that a 180-centimetre (5 ft 11 in) passenger did not have quite enough headroom to sit up straight in the third row.

In October 2026, Volvo launched its flagship electric SUV, the EX90, in India priced at Rs.1.26 crore (ex-showroom), offering introductory benefits including a home charger, 3-year service package and an assured buyback program.

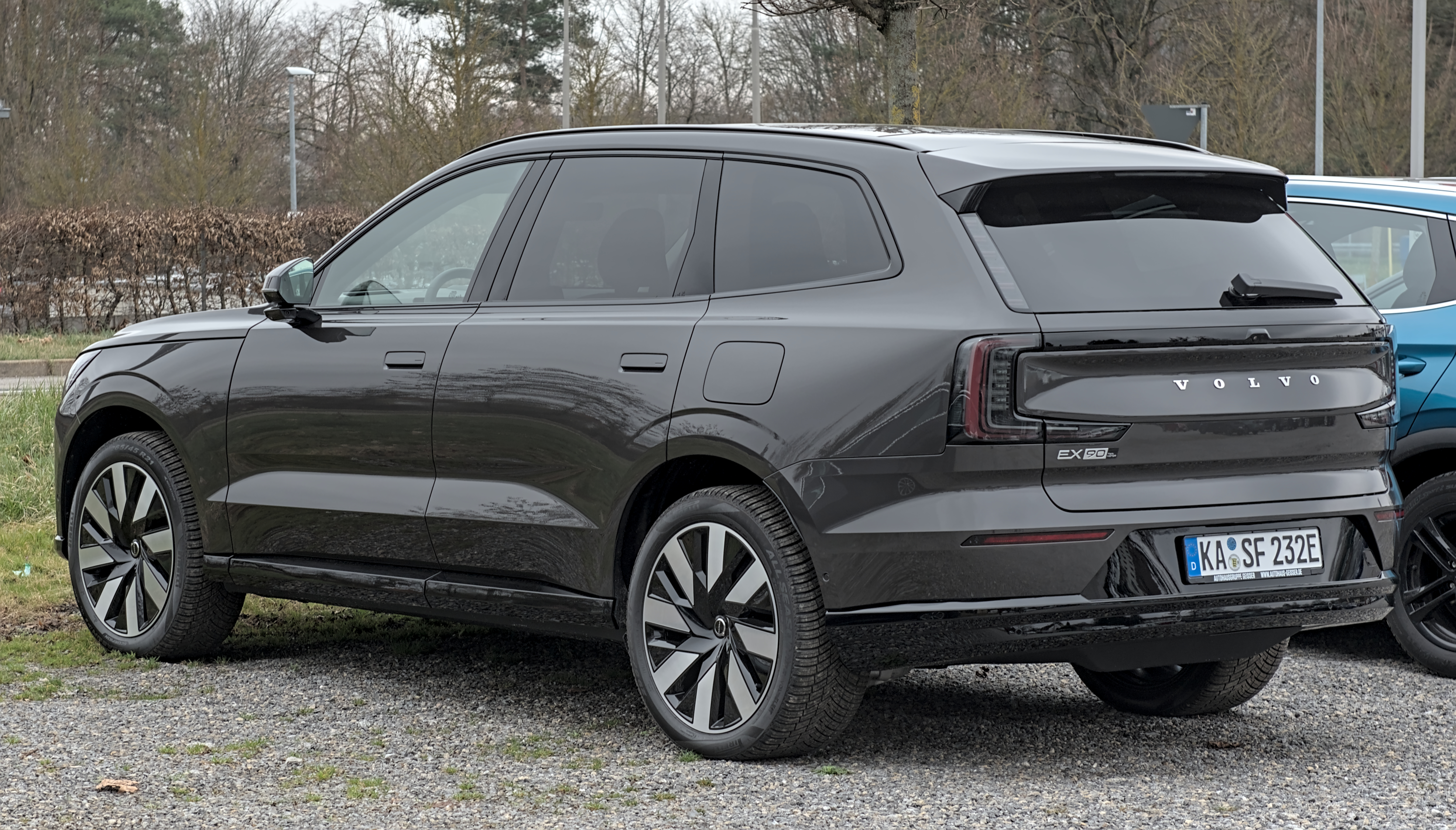
Rear view

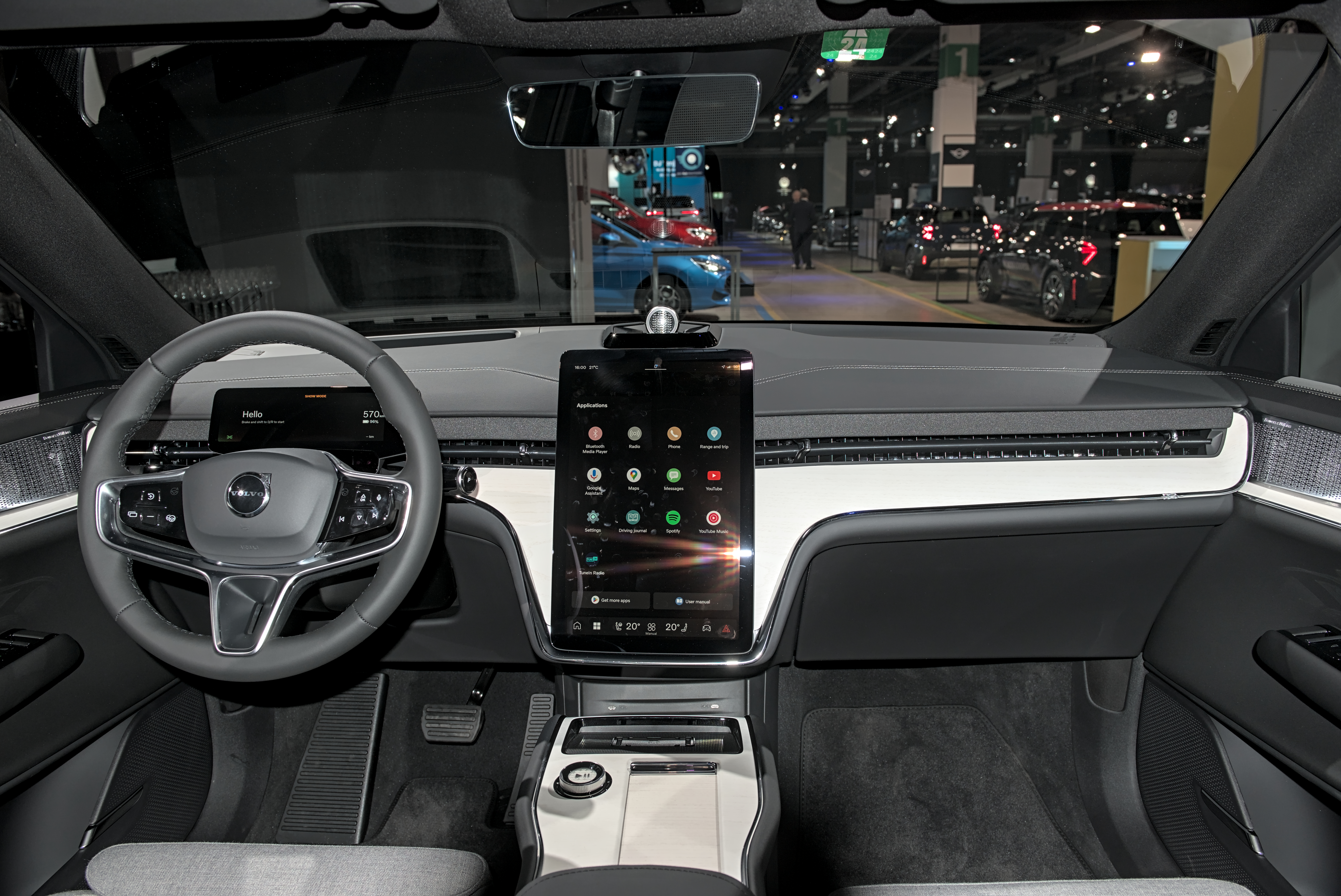
Interior

== EX90 Excellence ==
Unveiled at the Auto Shanghai show in April 2023, the EX90 Excellence is a four-seater, flagship version of the EX90 that features a two-tone exterior paint and different 22-inch wheel design. In the interior, the second and third rows were replaced by two individual rear seats, separated by a center console with a refrigerator. The variant has been compared by journalists with the Mercedes-Maybach EQS SUV which introduced a similar concept.

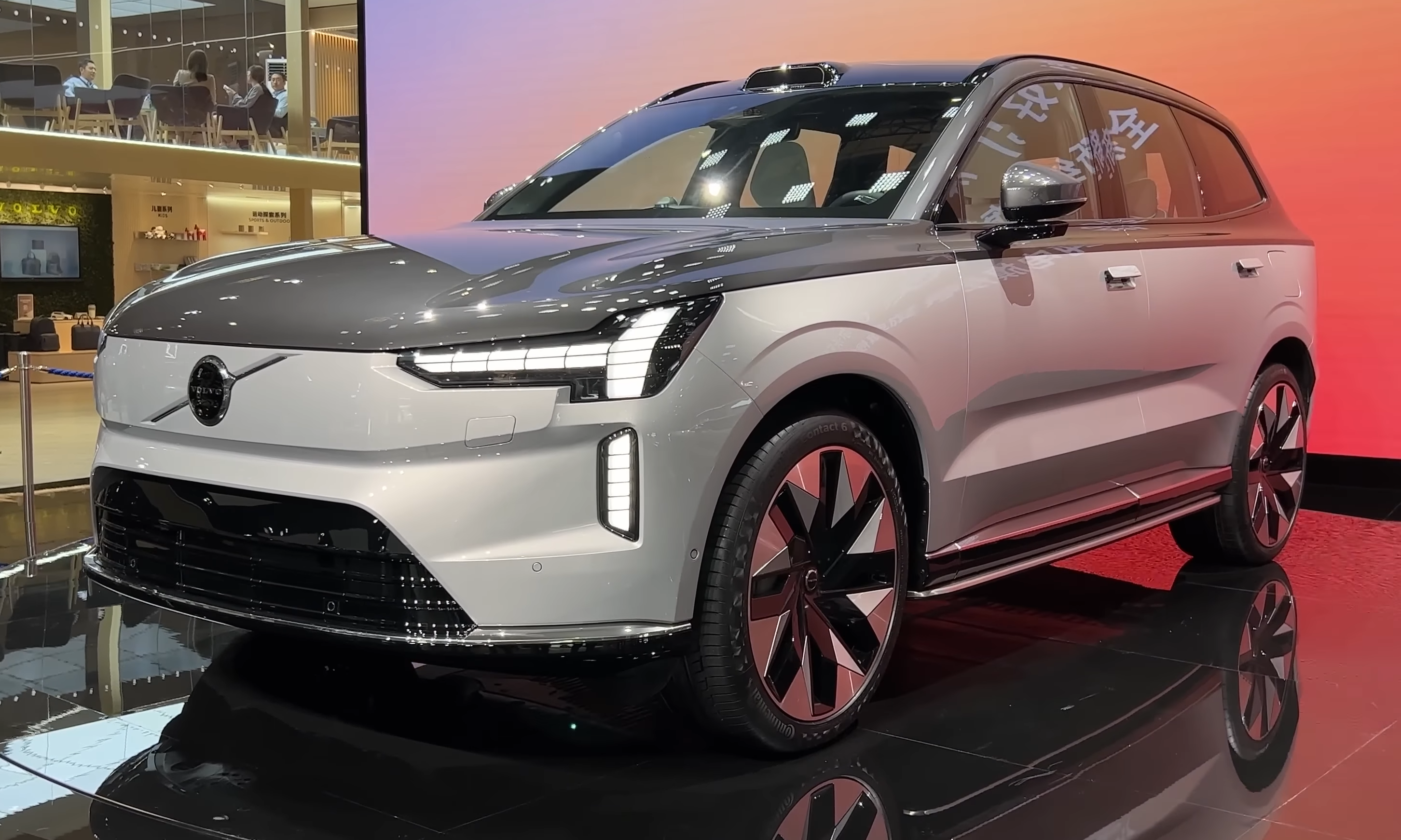
EX90 Excellence

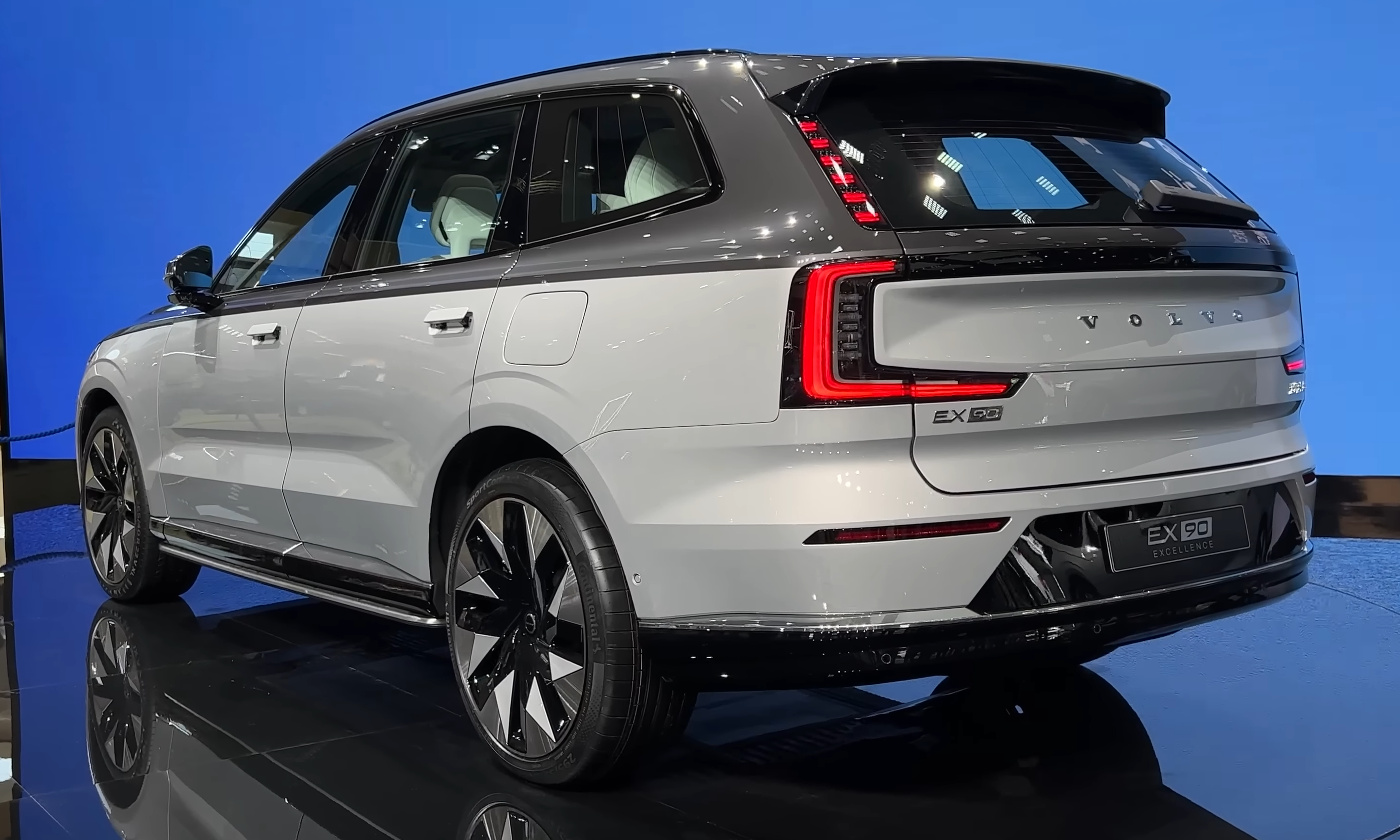
Rear view

== Safety ==
=== ANCAP ===
ANCAP test results Volvo EX90 (2025, aligned with Euro NCAP)
Test	Points	%
Overall:	5 /5 stars	
Adult occupant:	36.94	92%
Child occupant:	46.54	94%
Pedestrian:	52.24	82%
Safety assist:	15.25	84%

=== Euro NCAP ===
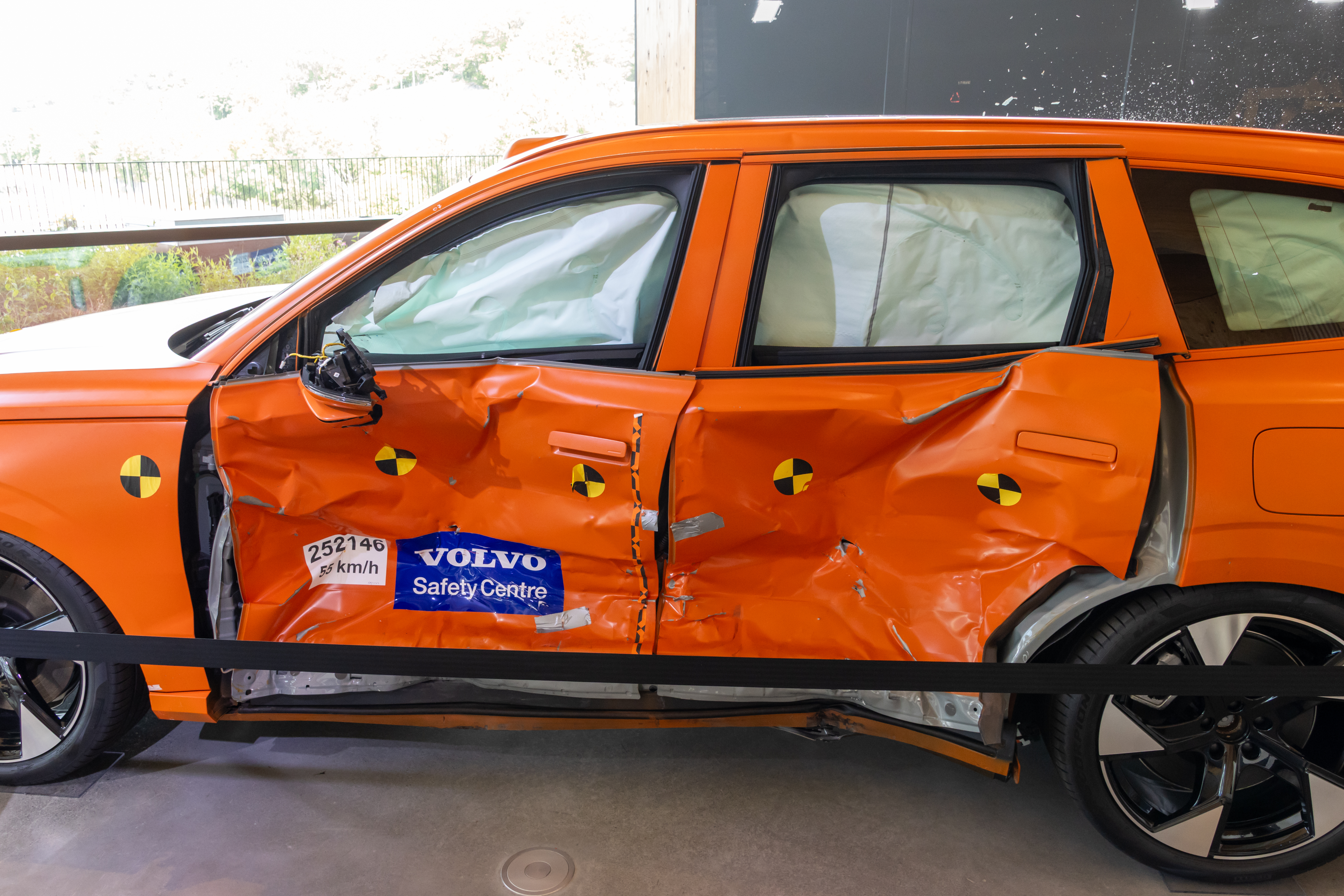
Side collision test vehicle on display at the World of Volvo museum

Euro NCAP test results Volvo EX90 Plus (LHD) (2025)
Test	Points	%
Overall:	5 /5 stars	
Adult occupant:	36.9	92%
Child occupant:	46.0	93%
Pedestrian:	52.2	82%
Safety assist:	15.6	86%

== Powertrains ==
Spec Model	Production	Battery	Battery capacity	DC Charging	Range (WLTP)	Power	Torque	0–100 km/h (0–62 mph)	Top speed	Drive
Single Motor	2024 – present	CATL lithium ion	101 kWh (usable) 104 kWh (gross)	250 kW	460 km (286 mi)	205 kW (275 hp)	490 N⋅m (361 lb⋅ft)	8.4 s	180 km/h (112 mph)	RWD
Twin Motor	2024 – present	CATL lithium ion	107 kWh (usable) 111 kWh (gross)	250 kW	465 km (289 mi)	300 kW (402 hp)	770 N⋅m (568 lb⋅ft)	5.9 s	180 km/h (112 mph)	AWD
Twin Motor Performance	2024 – present	CATL lithium ion	107 kWh (usable) 111 kWh (gross)	250 kW	450 km (280 mi)	380 kW (510 hp)	910 N⋅m (671 lb⋅ft)	4.9 s	180 km/h (112 mph)	AWD

== Awards ==
Before its market release, the EX90 was awarded "Best Safety Innovation Award" by AJAC (Automobile Journalists Association of Canada). Moreover, it won the World Luxury Car Award in April 2025, beating out the Porsche Macan and Porsche Panamera.

== Sales ==
Year	US	Global
2024	858	1,806
2025	3,913	
