= Volvo ES90 =

Battery electric executive car

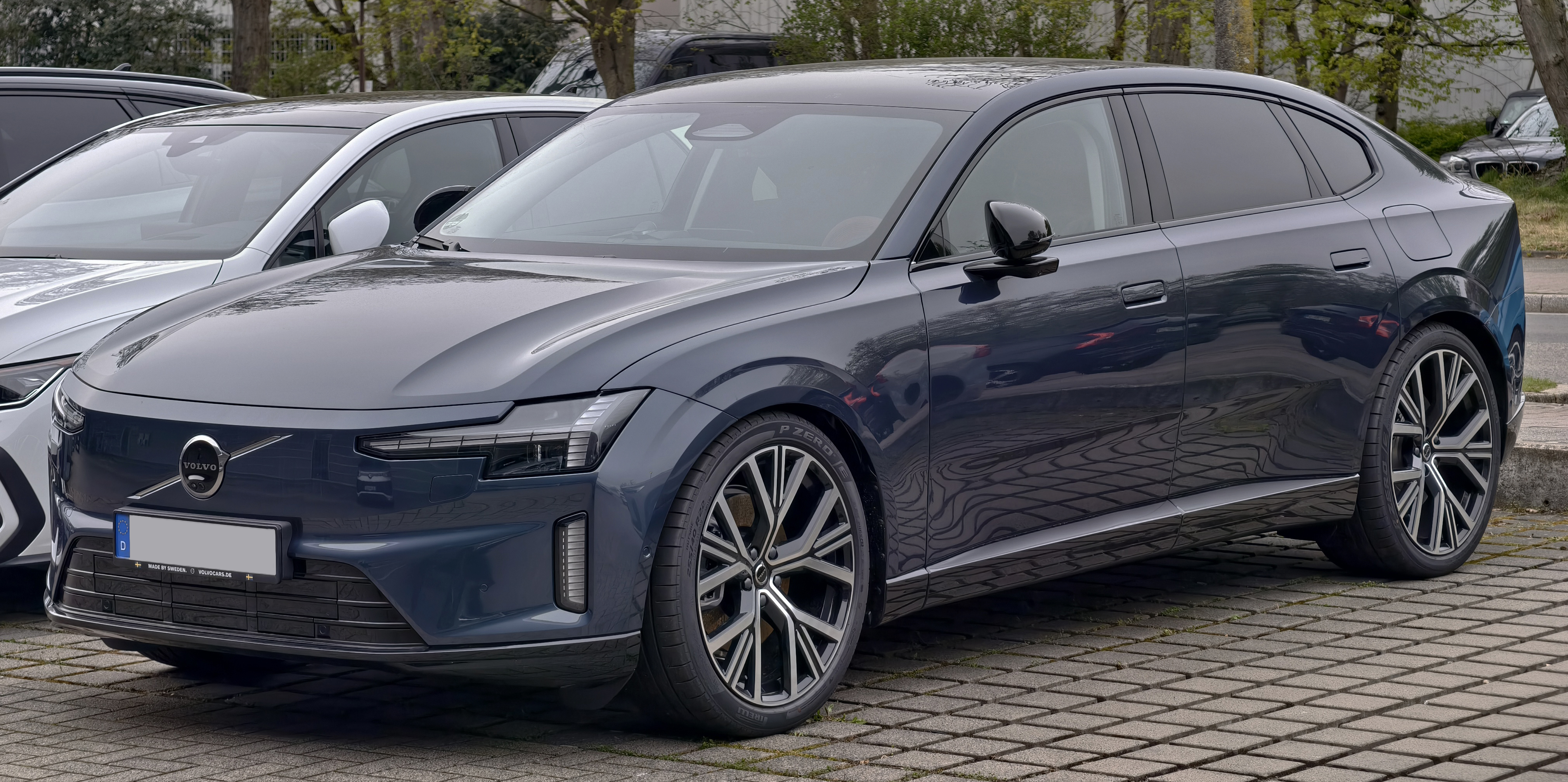

Overview
- Manufacturer: Volvo Cars
- Model code: V551
- Production: September 2025 – present
- Assembly: China: Chengdu, Sichuan; Malaysia: Shah Alam (Volvo Car Manufacturing Malaysia)

Body and chassis
- Class: Executive car (E)
- Body style: 5-door liftback
- Layout: Rear-motor, rear-wheel drive; Dual-motor, all-wheel-drive
- Platform: SPA2
- Related: Polestar 3; Volvo EX90

Powertrain
- Electric motor: 2× permanent magnet synchronous
- Power output: 245 kW (329 hp; 333 PS) (RWD); 330 kW (443 hp; 449 PS); 500 kW (671 hp; 680 PS) (Performance)
- Battery: 77 kWh LFP; 92 kWh CATL lithium-ion; 106 kWh CATL lithium-ion
- Electric range: 650–700 km (400–430 mi) (WLTP); 608–848 km (378–527 mi) (CLTC)

Dimensions
- Wheelbase: 3,100 mm (122.0 in)
- Length: 5,000 mm (196.9 in)
- Width: 1,942 mm (76.5 in)
- Height: 1,550 mm (61.0 in)
- Kerb weight: 2,500–2,600 kg (5,512–5,732 lb)

Chronology
- Predecessor: Volvo S90

The Volvo ES90 (internal code V551) is a battery electric executive car produced by Swedish manufacturer Volvo from 2025. It was revealed on 5 March 2025.

== Overview ==
The ES90 is based on the SPA2 platform dedicated to Volvo high-end vehicles, such as its SUV derivative EX90 or its cousin Polestar 3, and is the second Volvo product, after the EX90, to be based on its Superset tech stack. The ES90 was the first Volvo to feature a dual Nvidia Drive AGX Orin configuration, with the computer’s abilities to perform 508 trillion operations per second (TOPS). It has an 800-volt electric architecture that supports fast charging, which can add 300 km of electric range in 10 minutes at 350kW rapid charging stations. The ES90 features the same adaptive dampening system and dual-chamber air suspension found in the EX90.

Jeremy Offer, head of global design, claims the ES90 "adapted the saloon silhouette and added from a functional perspective a hatchback. But then working with the proportions of an electric platform, which has a higher driving position, we leveraged that and used that to our advantage, giving the car a higher stance and elevated driving position... [The ES90] is fundamentally a large saloon with these nuanced changes."

According to Volvo, the ES90 is designed to combine "the refined elegance of a sedan, the adaptability of a fastback, and the spacious interior and higher ground clearance associated with SUVs". The front fascia is distinguished by Thor’s hammer headlights, while the rear fascia features C-shaped LED taillights and LED lights placed on each side of the rear window. For customisation, customers can choose from seven exterior colours and four wheel options ranging from 20 to 22 inches in size. The ES90 has a low drag coefficient of 0.25, therefore it became the most aerodynamic Volvo product ever produced.

The interior can also be customised with six ambient lighting themes and a range of upholstery options. The dashboard has a 9-inch driver's digital display, 14.5-inch touchscreen infotainment system with Google built-in services, and a standard heads-up display. The infotainment display also provides a 3D view supported by a 360-degree camera system. Interior features include a Bowers & Wilkins sound system with 25 speakers and Dolby Atmos, a four-zone automatic climate control with an advanced air purifier that removes up to 95% of PM 2.5 particulates, and a panoramic roof with 99.9% UV protection.

The ES90 has a boot capacity at 425 L (15.0 cu ft), and 1,256 L (44.4 cu ft) when the rear seats folded which can be folded separately in 40:20:40 format. It is available with a frunk storage compartment of 22 L (0.78 cu ft).

For safety, the ES90 features Safe Space Technology package includes one lidar, five radars, seven cameras, 12 ultrasonic sensors, and an advanced driver understanding system inside the car.

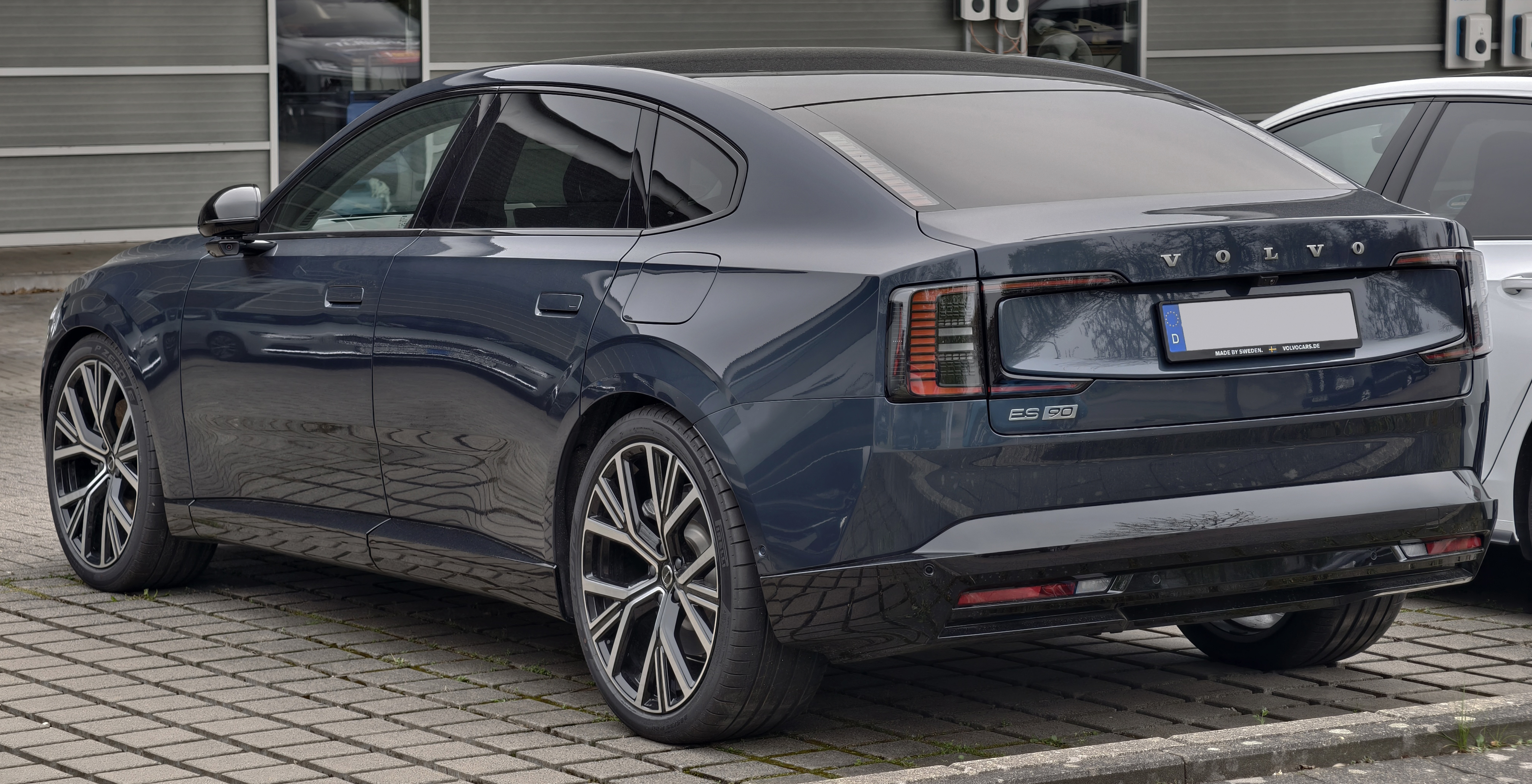
Rear view

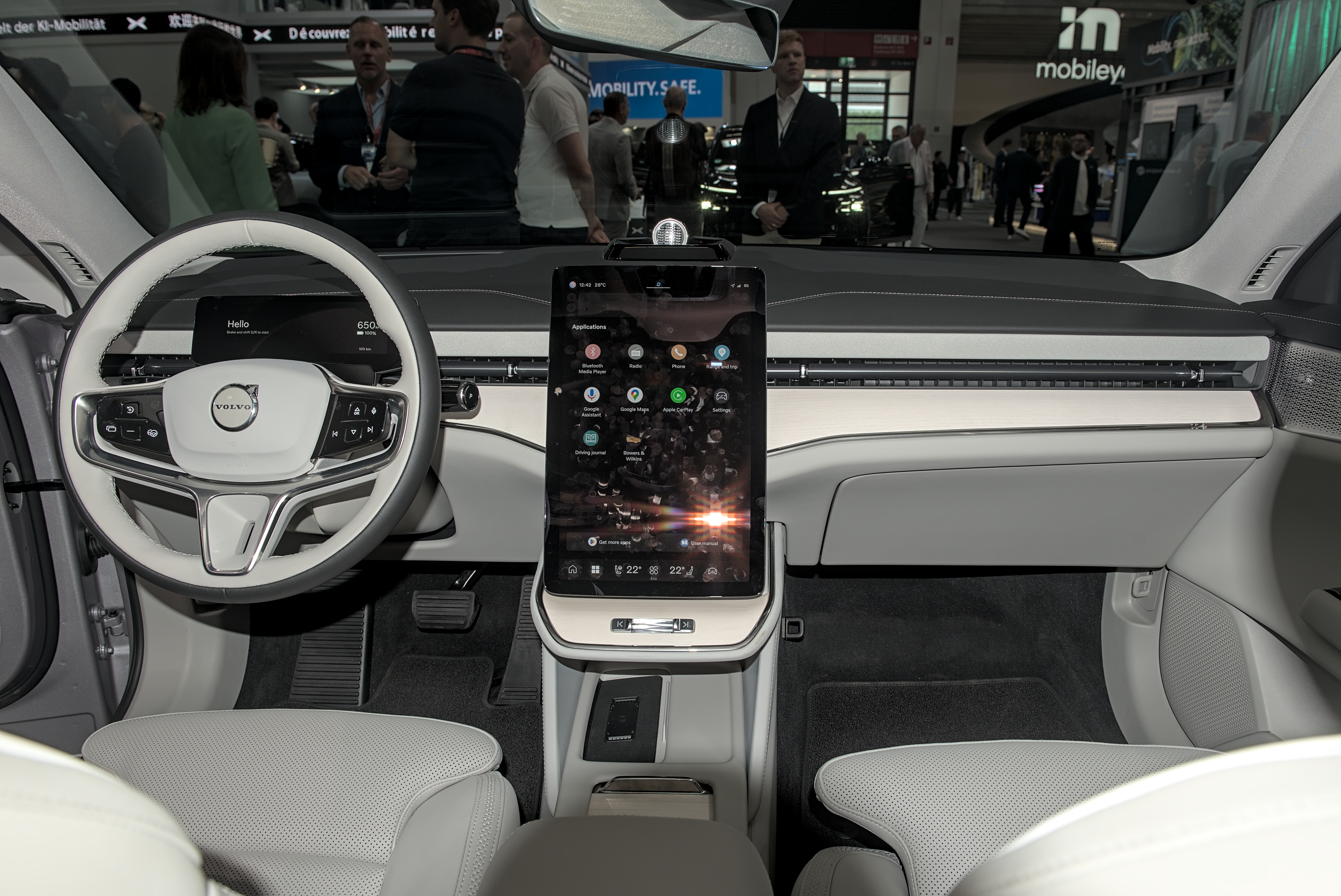
Interior

== Powertrains ==
Spec Model	Production	Battery	Battery capacity	DC Charging	Range (WLTP)	Power	Torque	0–100 km/h (0–62 mph)	Top speed	Drive
Single Motor	2025–present	CATL lithium ion	88 kWh (usable) 92 kWh (gross)	300 kW	650 km (404 mi)	245 kW (329 hp)	480 N⋅m (354 lb⋅ft)	6.9 s	180 km/h (112 mph)	RWD
Twin Motor	2025–present	CATL lithium ion	102 kWh (usable) 106 kWh (gross)	350 kW	700 km (435 mi)	330 kW (443 hp)	670 N⋅m (494 lb⋅ft)	5.5 s	180 km/h (112 mph)	AWD
Twin Motor Performance	2025–present	CATL lithium ion	102 kWh (usable) 106 kWh (gross)	350 kW	700 km (435 mi)	500 kW (671 hp)	870 N⋅m (642 lb⋅ft)	4.0 s	180 km/h (112 mph)	AWD

Powertrains (China)
Model	Battery		Power	Range	Top speed	Curb weight
Model	Type	Weight	Power	CLTC	Top speed	Curb weight
Base	77 kWh LFP	636 kg (1,402 lb)	322 hp (240 kW; 326 PS)	608 km (378 mi)	180 km/h (112 mph)	2,365 kg (5,214 lb)
RWD	92 kWh NMC	599 kg (1,321 lb)	329 hp (245 kW; 334 PS)	777 km (483 mi)	180 km/h (112 mph)	2,370 kg (5,225 lb)
RWD	92 kWh NMC	599 kg (1,321 lb)	329 hp (245 kW; 334 PS)	720 km (447 mi)	180 km/h (112 mph)	2,380 kg (5,247 lb)
AWD	106 kWh NMC	662 kg (1,459 lb)	671 hp (500 kW; 680 PS)	848 km (527 mi)	180 km/h (112 mph)	2,558 kg (5,639 lb)
AWD	106 kWh NMC	662 kg (1,459 lb)	671 hp (500 kW; 680 PS)	815 km (506 mi)	180 km/h (112 mph)	2,579 kg (5,686 lb)
