= Polestar 3 =

Battery electric mid-size luxury crossover SUV

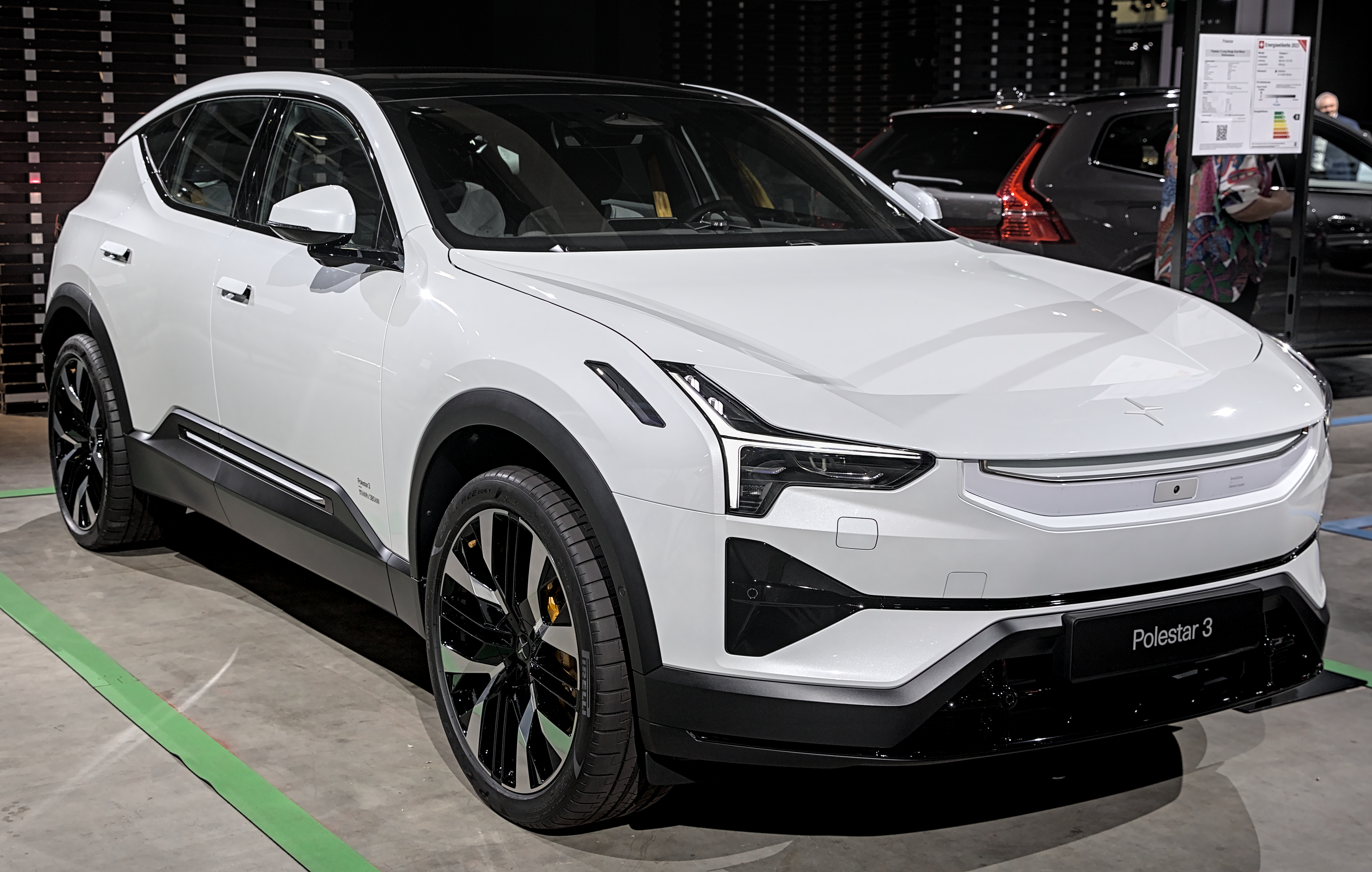

Overview
- Manufacturer: Polestar
- Model code: P519
- Production: February 2024 – present
- Model years: 2024–present 2024–2026 (United States)
- Assembly: China: Chengdu, Sichuan (ZAMC, 2024–2026); United States: Ridgeville, South Carolina (South Carolina Factory)
- Designer: Nahum Escobedo, Su-bum Lee under Maximilian Missoni

Body and chassis
- Class: Mid-size luxury crossover SUV (E)
- Body style: 5-door SUV
- Layout: Dual-motor, all-wheel-drive
- Platform: SPA2
- Related: Volvo EX90; Volvo ES90

Powertrain
- Electric motor: 2× Permanent Magnet Synchronous motors E400V11
- Power output: 489 hp (365 kW); 517 hp (386 kW) (with Performance Pack)
- Battery: 111 kWh (400 MJ)

Dimensions
- Wheelbase: 2,985 mm (117.5 in)
- Length: 4,900 mm (192.9 in)
- Width: 1,968 mm (77.5 in)
- Height: 1,614 mm (63.5 in)
- Curb weight: 2,584 kg (5,697 lb)

The Polestar 3 is a battery electric mid-size luxury crossover SUV produced by Swedish manufacturer Polestar, an affiliate of Geely Holding and Volvo Cars, since 2024. The Polestar 3 is the first vehicle to use the SPA2 platform, a vehicle platform which is dedicated to battery-electric vehicles.

The vehicle is based on Volvo's similarly sized EX90 crossover.

== Overview ==
The Polestar 3 was officially revealed on 12 October 2022 and is on the same platform as the upcoming Volvo EX90 flagship SUV, both of which are based on the 2021 Volvo Recharge concept. The vehicle made its public debut at the April 2023 Shanghai Auto Show. Measuring 4,900 mm (193 in) long, the vehicle belongs to the British E-segment size segmentation.

Despite being similarly sized to the EX90 third-row vehicle, the 3 is exclusively a five-seater. Trim levels include the 'Long Range' and the 'Performance Pack', similar trims to the EX90. Both trims run on the same battery.

The vehicle was produced in Chengdu, Sichuan and Ridgeville, South Carolina until March 2026, when production shifted solely to the Ridgeville facility.

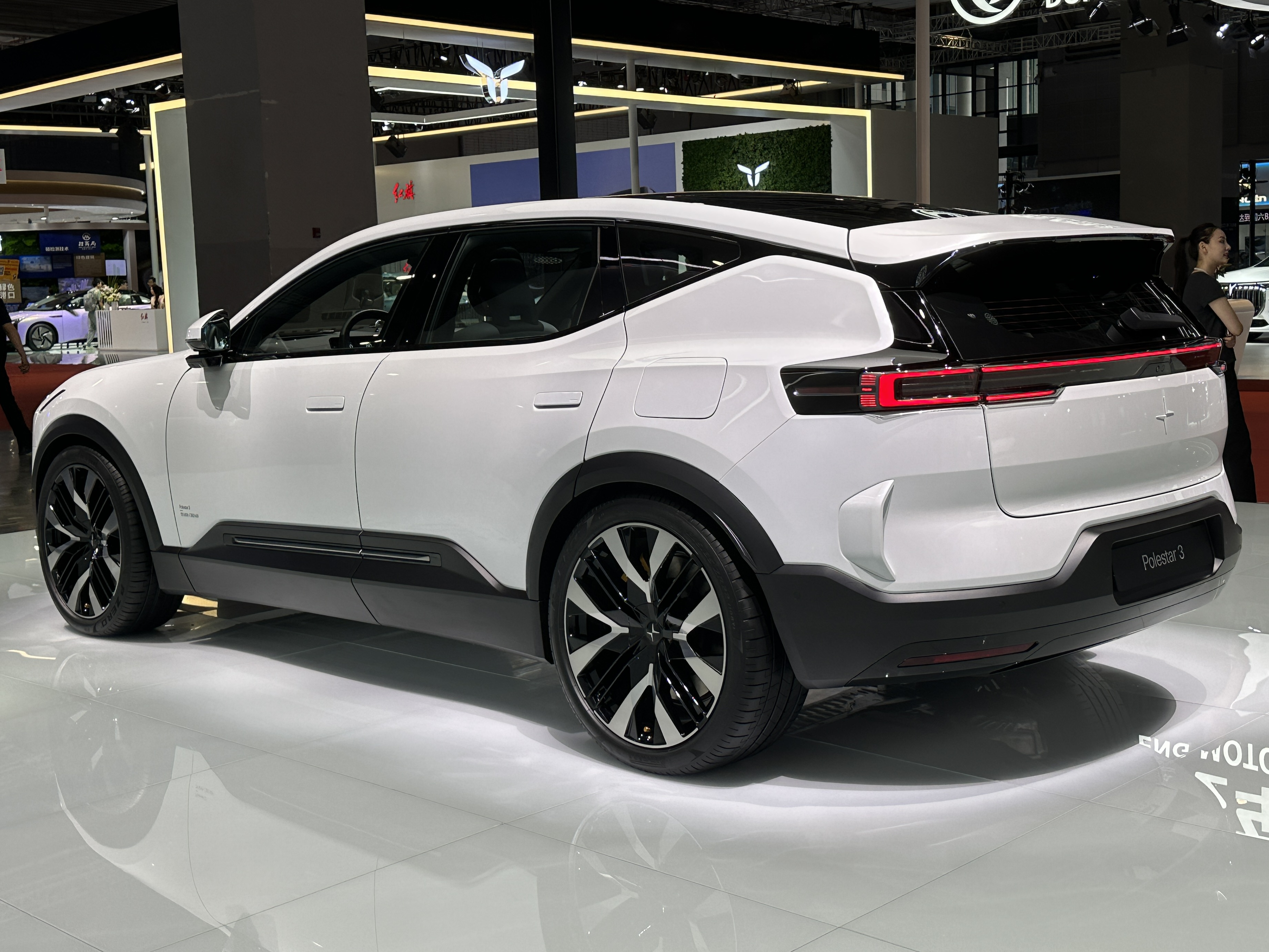
Rear view

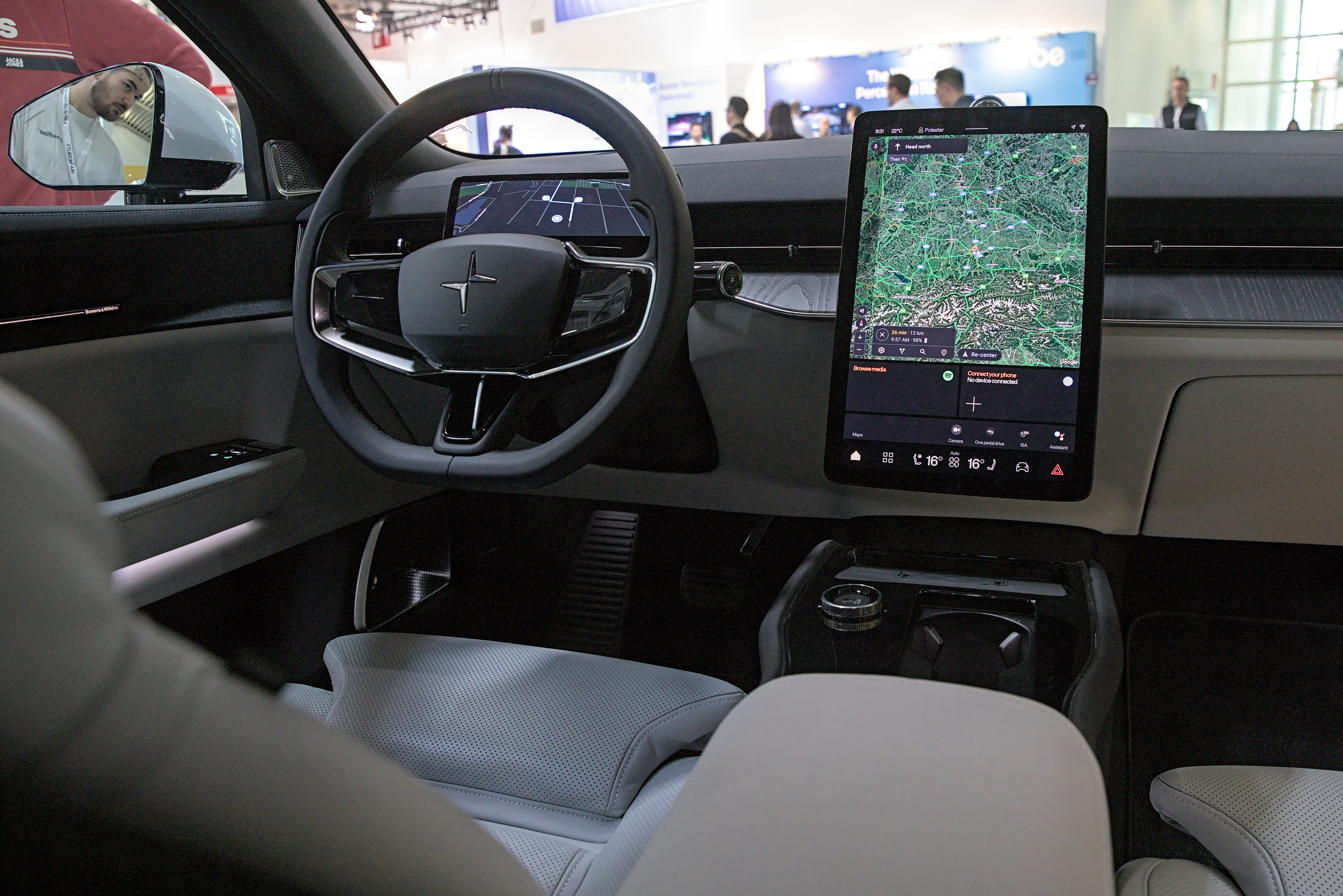
Interior

== Equipment ==
20 to 22-inch wheels, Android Automotive, which is seen in the Polestar 4 and the 2 comes standard. A 14.5-inch central touchscreen, a central computer from Nvidia, 3-zone climate control air conditioning with the CleanZone system, heated steering wheel, and USB-C charging (2 front, 2 rear) all come standard on the 3.

== Powertrain ==
The 3 has a choice of two models: the Dual Motor, and the Dual Motor Performance Pack. The base Dual Motor has a combined output of 360 kW (489 PS; 483 hp) and 840 N⋅m (620 lb⋅ft), and a WLTP-rated range of 610 km (379 mi). The Performance Pack model has a combined output of 380 kW (517 PS; 510 hp) and 910 N⋅m (671 lb⋅ft), with a WLTP-rated range of 560 km (348 mi).

Both models have two permanent-magnet synchronous motors, with one at each axle. The rear axle features true torque vectoring and improved economy using a rear motor disconnect clutch. Both models use a single-speed transmission, and a 111 kWh battery.

| Type | Model | Amount of motors | Range | Power | Torque | Electric motor | Battery | Top speed | 0–100 km/h (0–62 mph) | Transmission | Layout | Cal. years |
|---|---|---|---|---|---|---|---|---|---|---|---|---|
| BEV | Dual Motor, Long Range | 2 | 610 km (379 mi)^{WLTP} | 360 kW (483 hp; 489 PS) | 840 N⋅m (85.7 kg⋅m; 620 lb⋅ft) | 2x PMSM | 111 kWh, 400 V nickel manganese cobalt | 210 km/h (130 mph) | 5.0 s | 1-speed direct-drive | AWD | |
| BEV | Dual Motor, Long Range | 2 | 610 km (379 mi)^{WLTP} | 360 kW (483 hp; 489 PS) | 840 N⋅m (85.7 kg⋅m; 620 lb⋅ft) | 2x PMSM | 111 kWh, 400 V nickel manganese cobalt | 210 km/h (130 mph) | 5.0 s | 1-speed direct-drive | AWD | 2023–present |
| BEV | Dual Motor, Long Range (Performance Pack) | 2 | 560 km (348 mi)^{WLTP} | 380 kW (510 hp; 517 PS) | 910 N⋅m (92.8 kg⋅m; 671 lb⋅ft) | 2x PMSM | 111 kWh, 400 V nickel manganese cobalt | 210 km/h (130 mph) | 4.7 s | 1-speed direct-drive | AWD | |
| BEV | Dual Motor, Long Range (Performance Pack) | 2 | 560 km (348 mi)^{WLTP} | 380 kW (510 hp; 517 PS) | 910 N⋅m (92.8 kg⋅m; 671 lb⋅ft) | 2x PMSM | 111 kWh, 400 V nickel manganese cobalt | 210 km/h (130 mph) | 4.7 s | 1-speed direct-drive | AWD | 2023–present |

== Safety ==
Euro NCAP test results Polestar 3 Long range Dual motor Plus Pilot (LHD) (2025)
| Test | Points | % |
|---|---|---|
| Overall: | 5 /5 stars | |
| Adult occupant: | 36 | 90% |
| Child occupant: | 46 | 93% |
| Pedestrian: | 50.1 | 79% |
| Safety assist: | 15.1 | 83% |

ANCAP test results Polestar 3 (2025, aligned with Euro NCAP)
| Test | Points | % |
|---|---|---|
| Overall: | 5 /5 stars | |
| Adult occupant: | 36.04 | 90% |
| Child occupant: | 46.22 | 94% |
| Pedestrian: | 50.10 | 79% |
| Safety assist: | 14.23 | 79% |

== Sales ==
| Year | China production |
|---|---|
| 2024 | 9,763 |
| 2025 | 1,425 |
