= Volvo XC60 =

Compact luxury crossover SUV

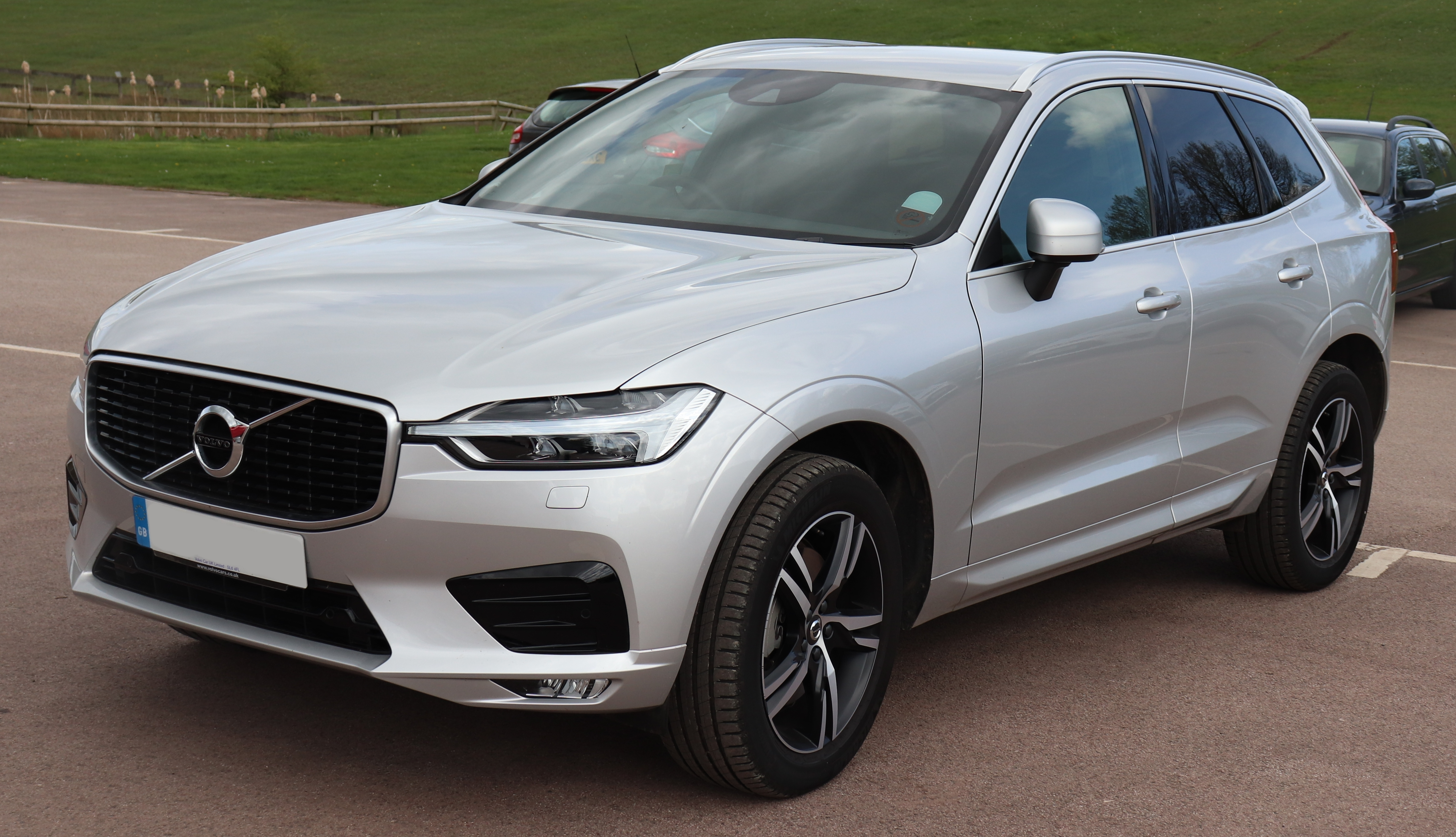
- 2018 Volvo XC60 R-Design D5 P-Pulse

Overview
- Manufacturer: Volvo Cars
- Production: 2008–present

Body and chassis
- Class: Compact luxury crossover SUV
- Body style: 5-door SUV
- Layout: Front-engine, front-wheel-drive (2008–2017); Front-engine, four-wheel-drive

The Volvo XC60 is a compact luxury crossover SUV manufactured and marketed by Swedish automaker Volvo Cars since 2008.

The XC60 is part of Volvo's 60 Series of automobiles, along with the S60 and V60. The first generation model introduced a new style for the 60 Series models. Along with the rest of the line-up, the first-generation XC60 was refreshed in 2013. Similarly, the second-generation model, released in 2017, is the first in the series. The car was named Car of the Year Japan for 2017–2018.

== XC60 concept (2007) ==
The XC60 concept was unveiled at the 2007 Detroit Auto Show. It included a glass roof and a newly styled grille. The model introduced Volvo's new styling cues, which were gradually implemented throughout the model range. The XC60 concept also included a new shifting mechanism, electronic bootlid, and 20-inch wheels.

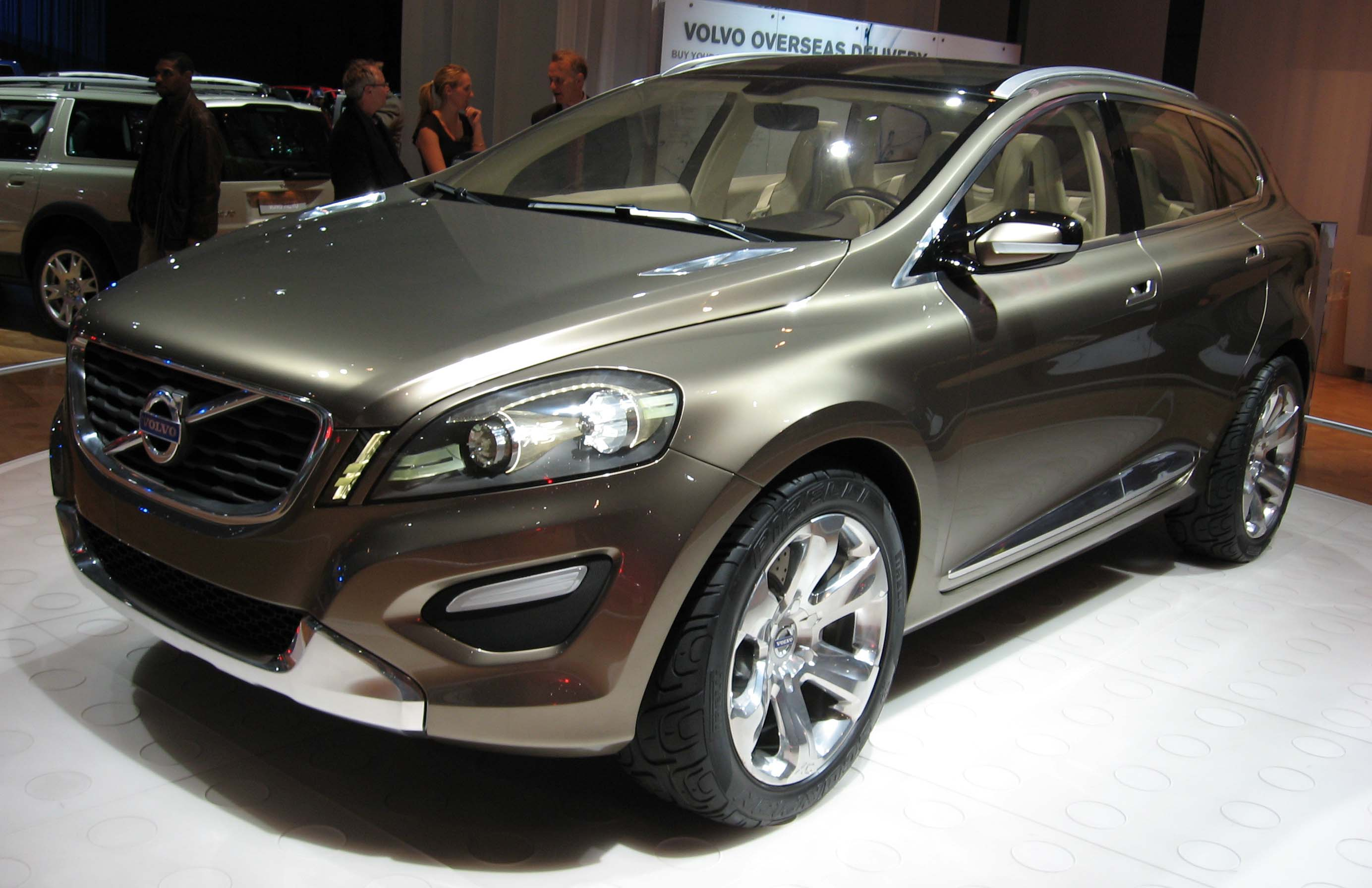
Volvo XC60 concept

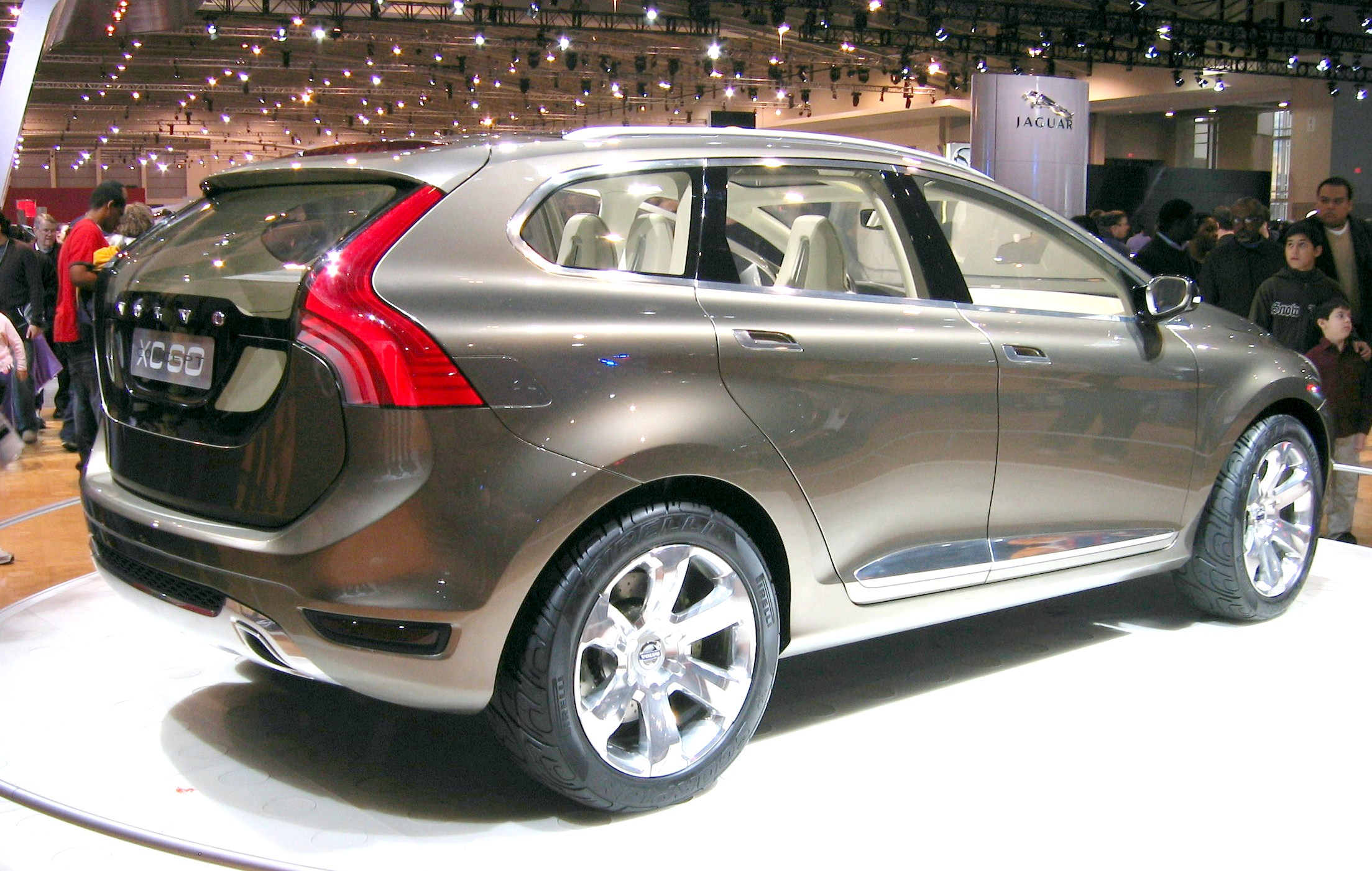
Volvo XC60 concept

== First generation (2008–2017) ==
First generation
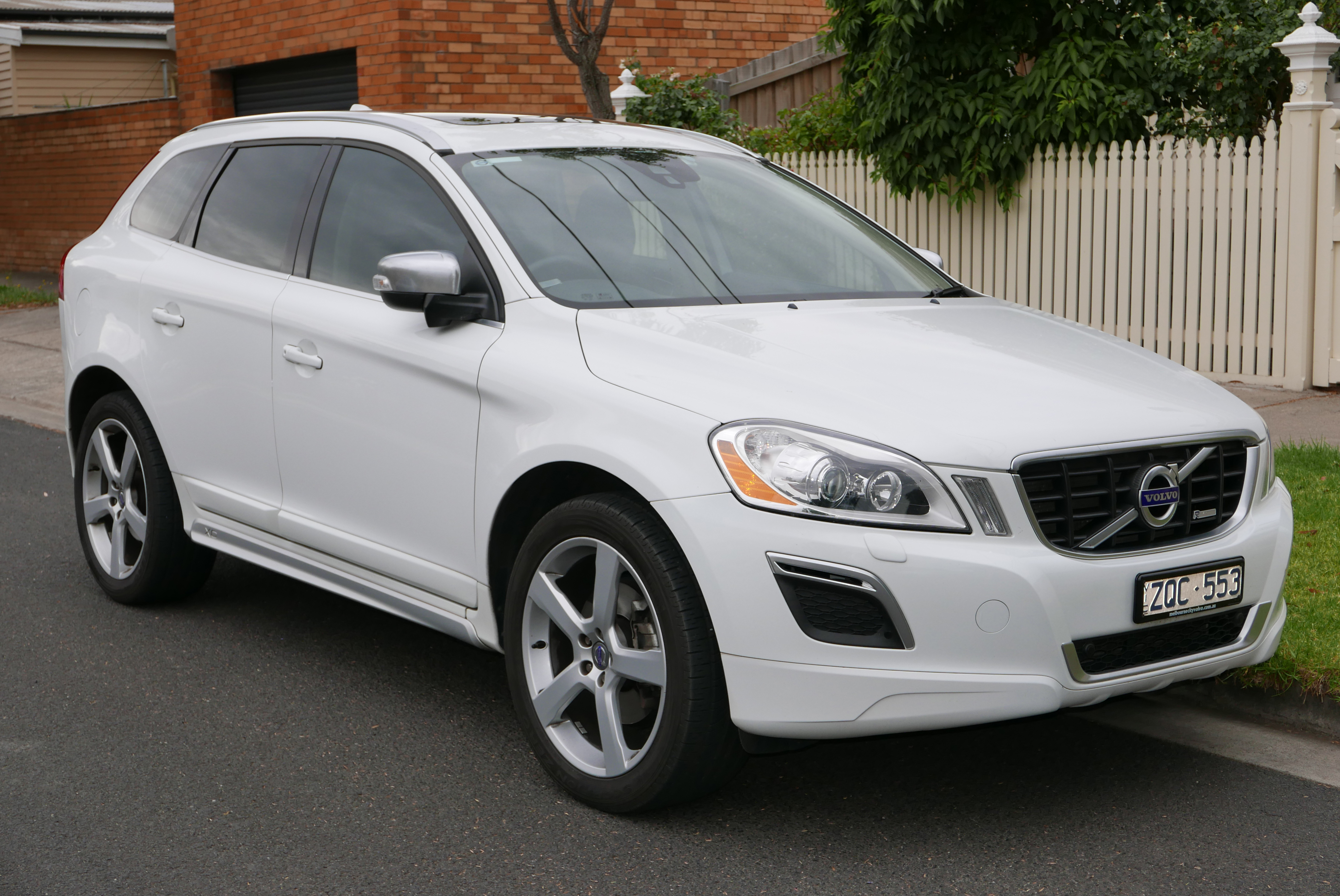
- 2013 Volvo XC60 (AU)

Overview
- Production: October 2008–April 2017
- Model years: 2009–2017
- Assembly: Belgium: Ghent (VCG); India: Bengaluru (Volvo Trucks); China: Chengdu (ZAMC); Malaysia: Shah Alam (SMA)
- Designer: Steve Mattin

Body and chassis
- Layout: Front-engine, front-wheel-drive or all-wheel drive
- Platform: Volvo P3 platform
- Related: Volvo V70 III; Volvo S80 II

Powertrain
- Engine: petrol: 2.0 L I4; 2.0–2.5 L I5; 2.9–3.2 L I6; diesel: 2.0 L I4; 2.0–2.5 L I5
- Transmission: 6-speed Volvo M66 manual; 6-speed AW TF-80SC automatic; 8-speed Aisin TG-81 SC automatic

Dimensions
- Wheelbase: 2,774 mm (109.2 in)
- Length: 4,644 mm (182.8 in)
- Width: 1,891 mm (74.4 in)
- Height: 1,715 mm (67.5 in)
- Curb weight: 1,809–1,900 kg (3,988–4,189 lb)

The production vehicle was unveiled at the 2008 Geneva Motor Show. Sales began in Europe in the third quarter of 2008 and in North America in early 2009 as a 2010 model. The XC60 has been Volvo's best selling car since 2009.

Manufactured by subsidiary Volvo Car Gent in Ghent, Belgium, the first generation XC60 is based on Volvo's P3 platform and the XC60 shares technology with the Land Rover Freelander of 2007. At the time of development, both Land Rover and Volvo were owned by Ford and development was split between the two subsidiaries. Much of the engineering and tuning of the crossover was done by Volvo in Sweden, although offroad capabilities were developed at Land Rover in England.

In April 2010, an R-Design variant of the XC60 became available, featuring a colour-matching body kit, stiffer chassis and damping, and other unique exterior/interior trim.

In February 2013, Volvo debuted a refreshed version of the XC60, to be released for the 2014 model year. Exterior updates are primarily cosmetic, with changes to the grille and front driving lights, loss of black cladding along the lower doorsills, and minor changes to the exhaust tips and taillights. Interior updates include new materials and dashboard trims, available paddle shifter on the T6 model, and introduction of a 7" display.

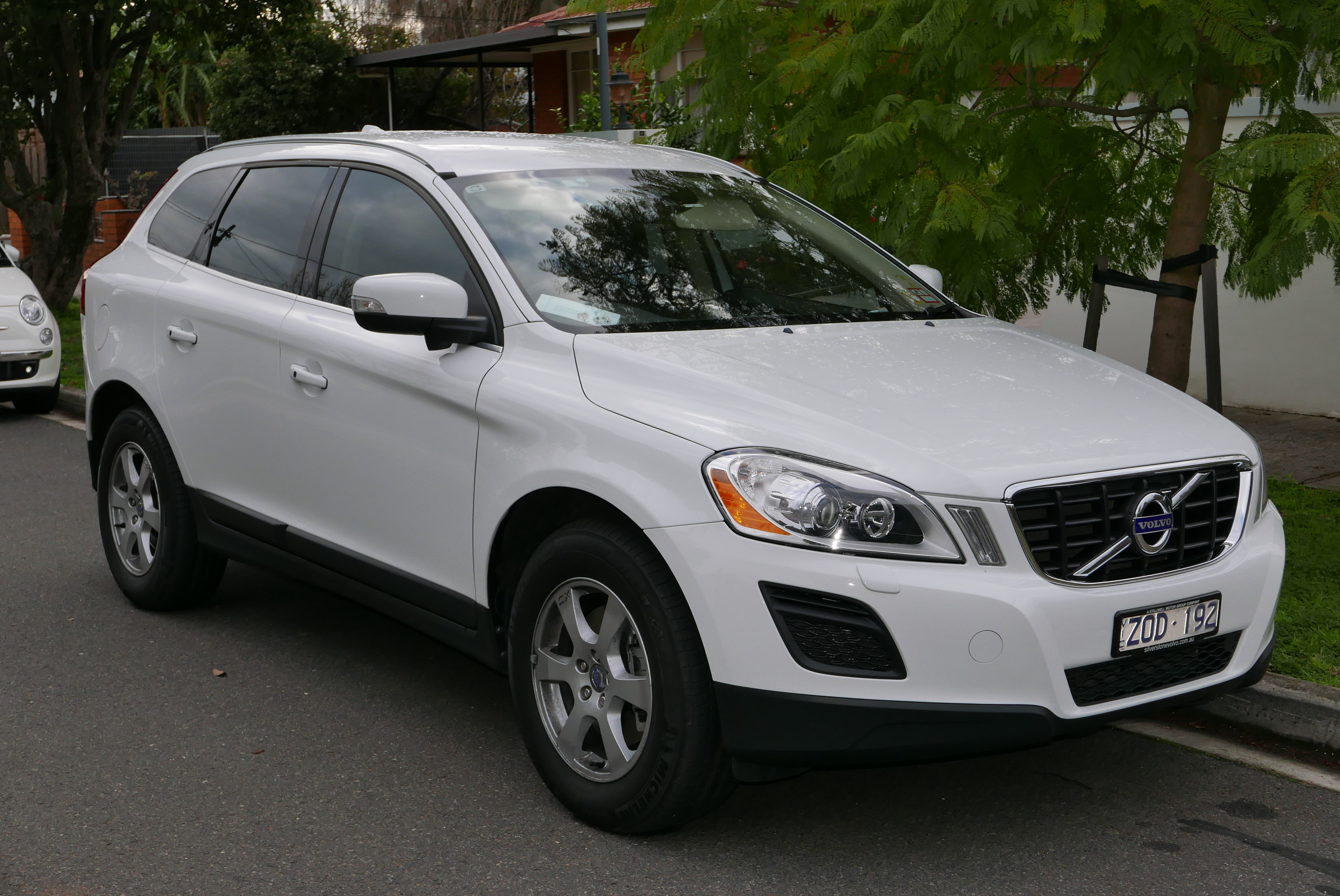
Volvo XC60 pre-facelift (AU)

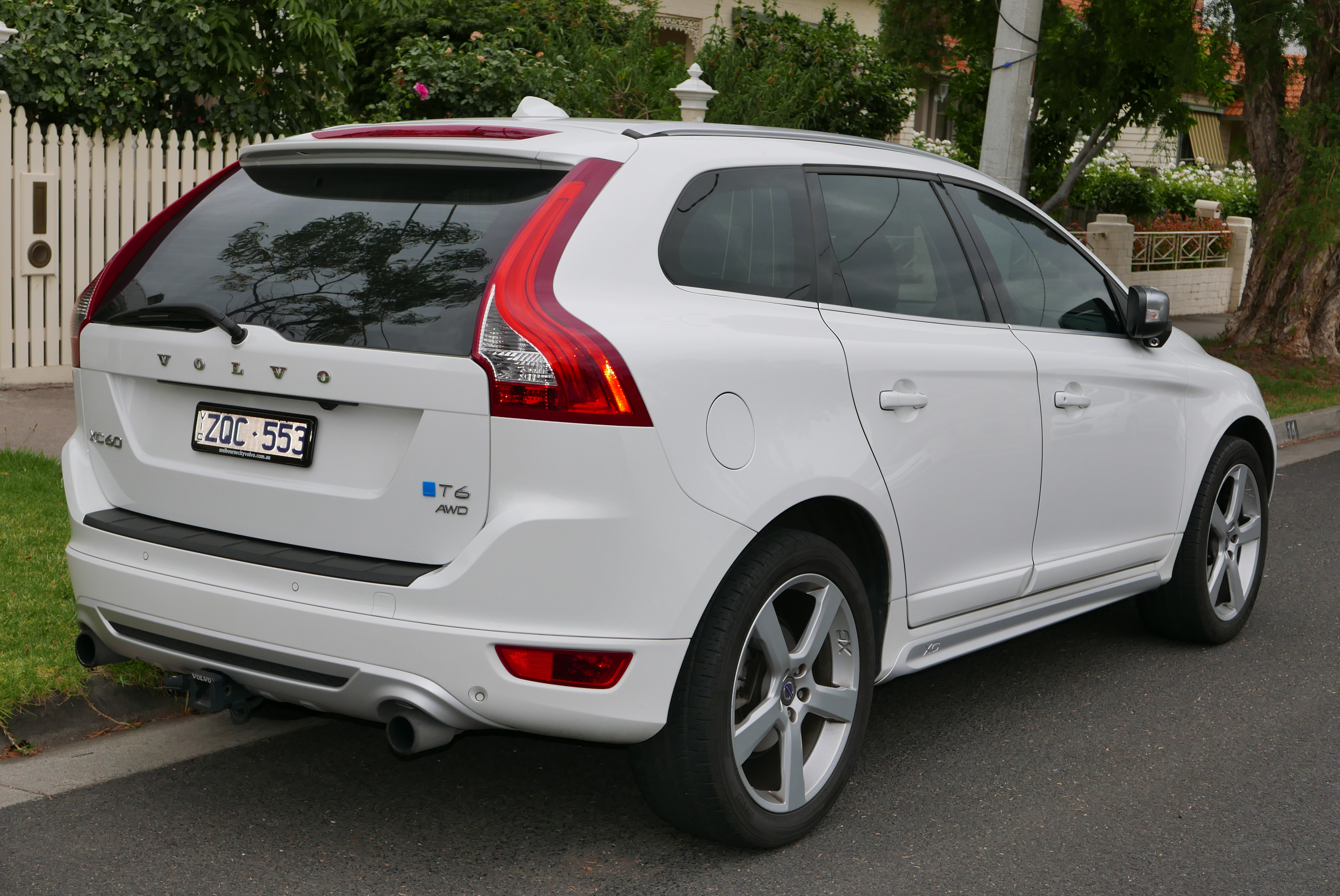
Volvo XC60 R-Design pre-facelift (AU)

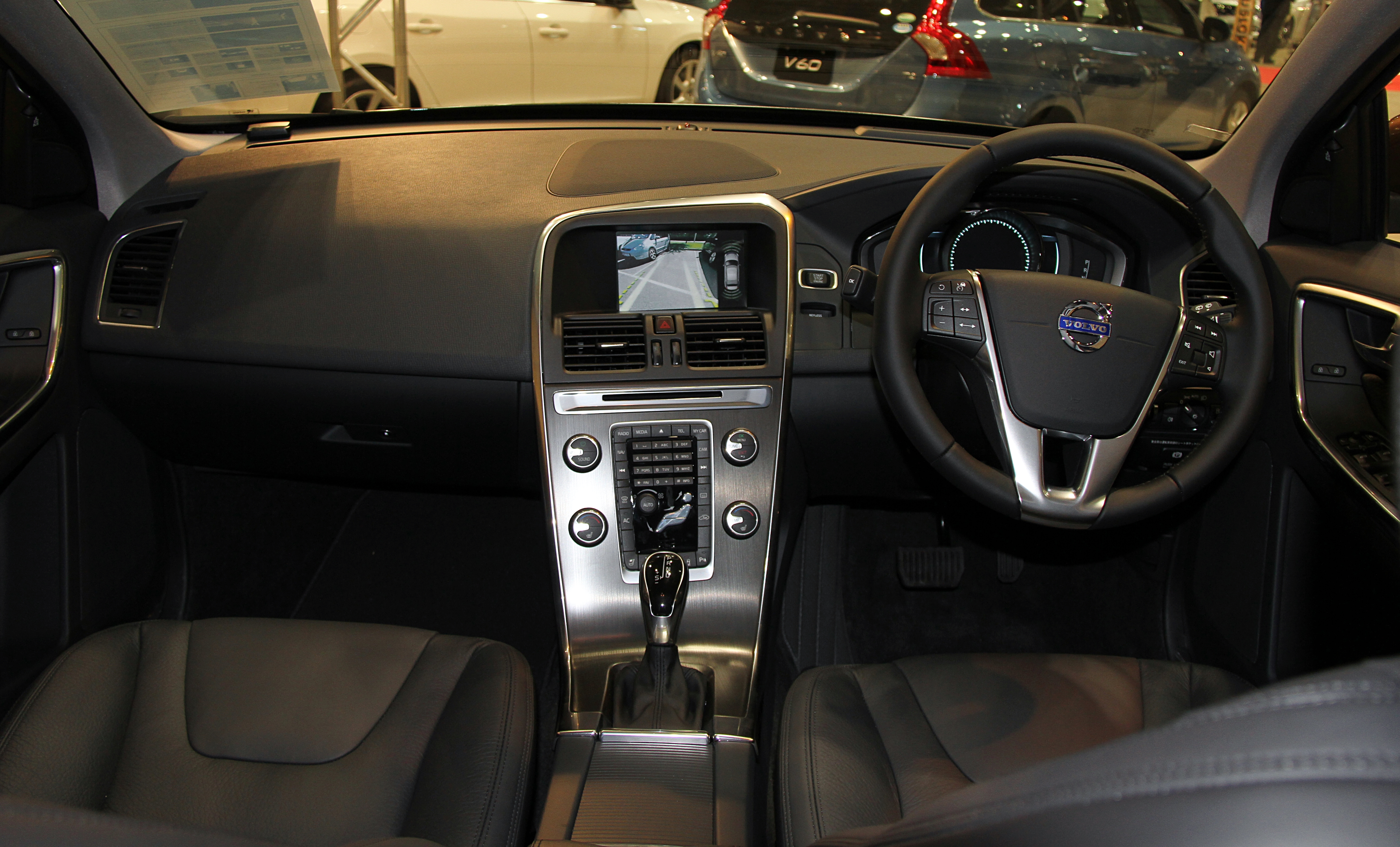
Volvo XC60 interior post-facelift

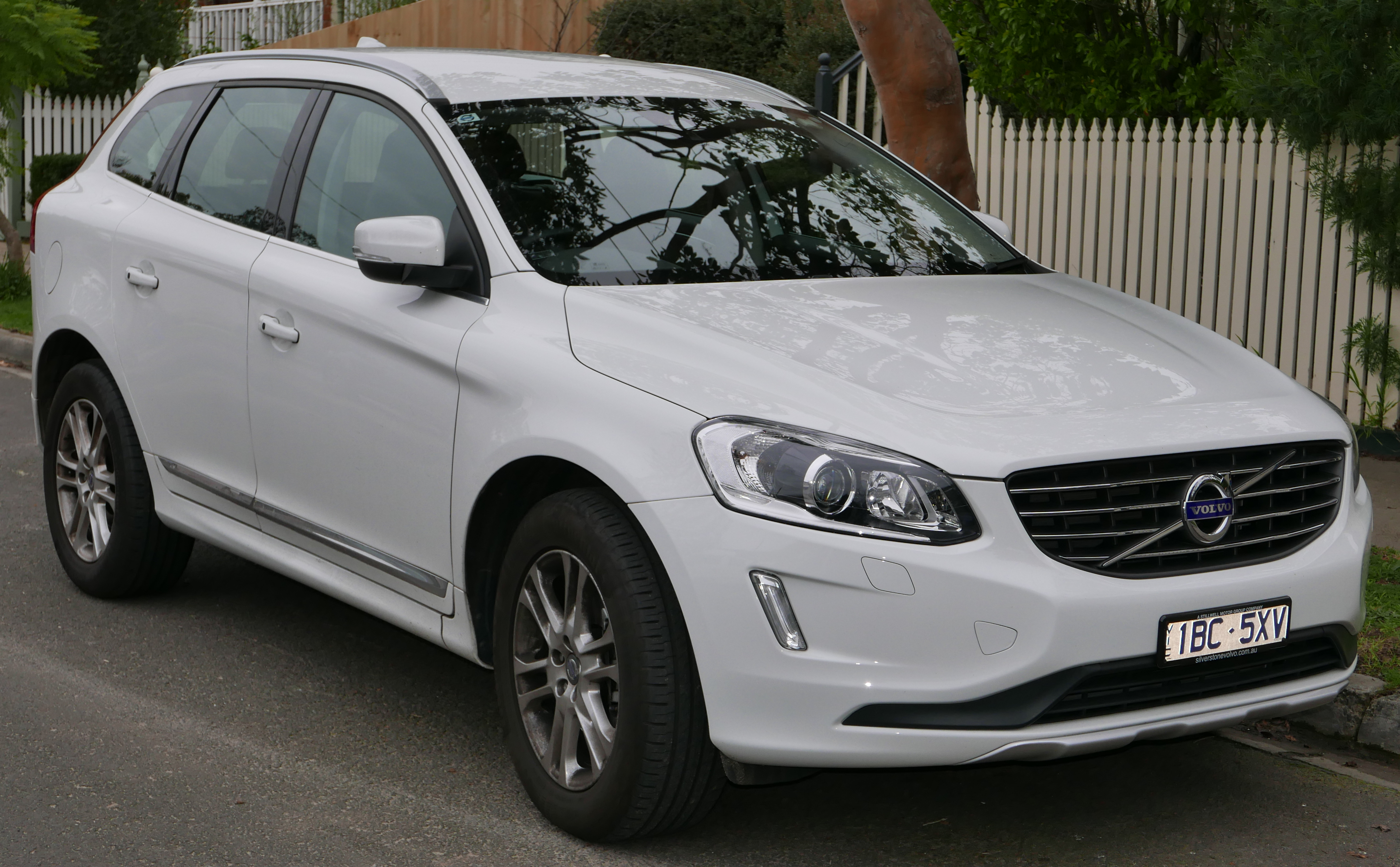
Volvo XC60 post-facelift (AU)

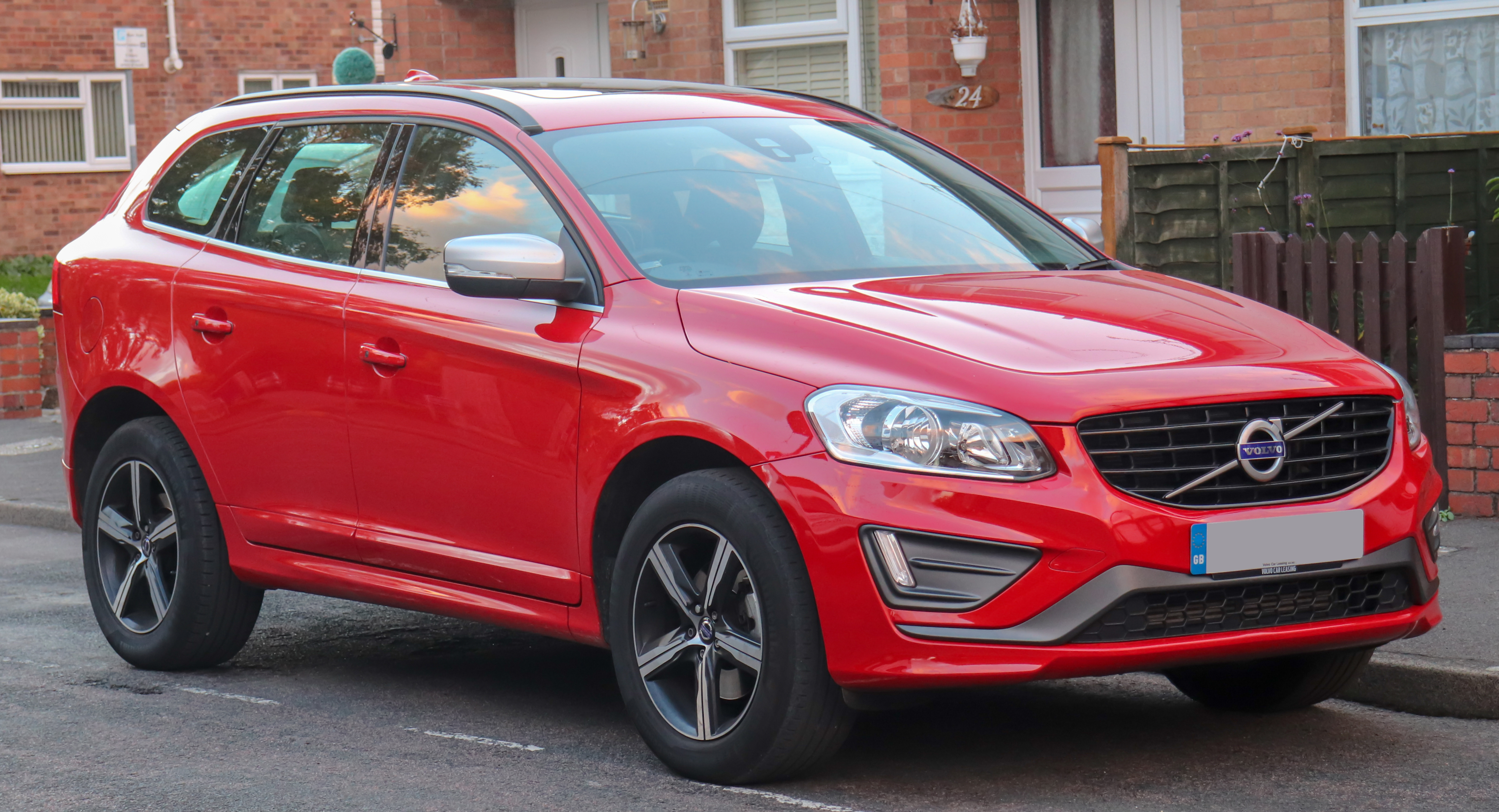
Volvo XC60 R-Design post-facelift (UK)

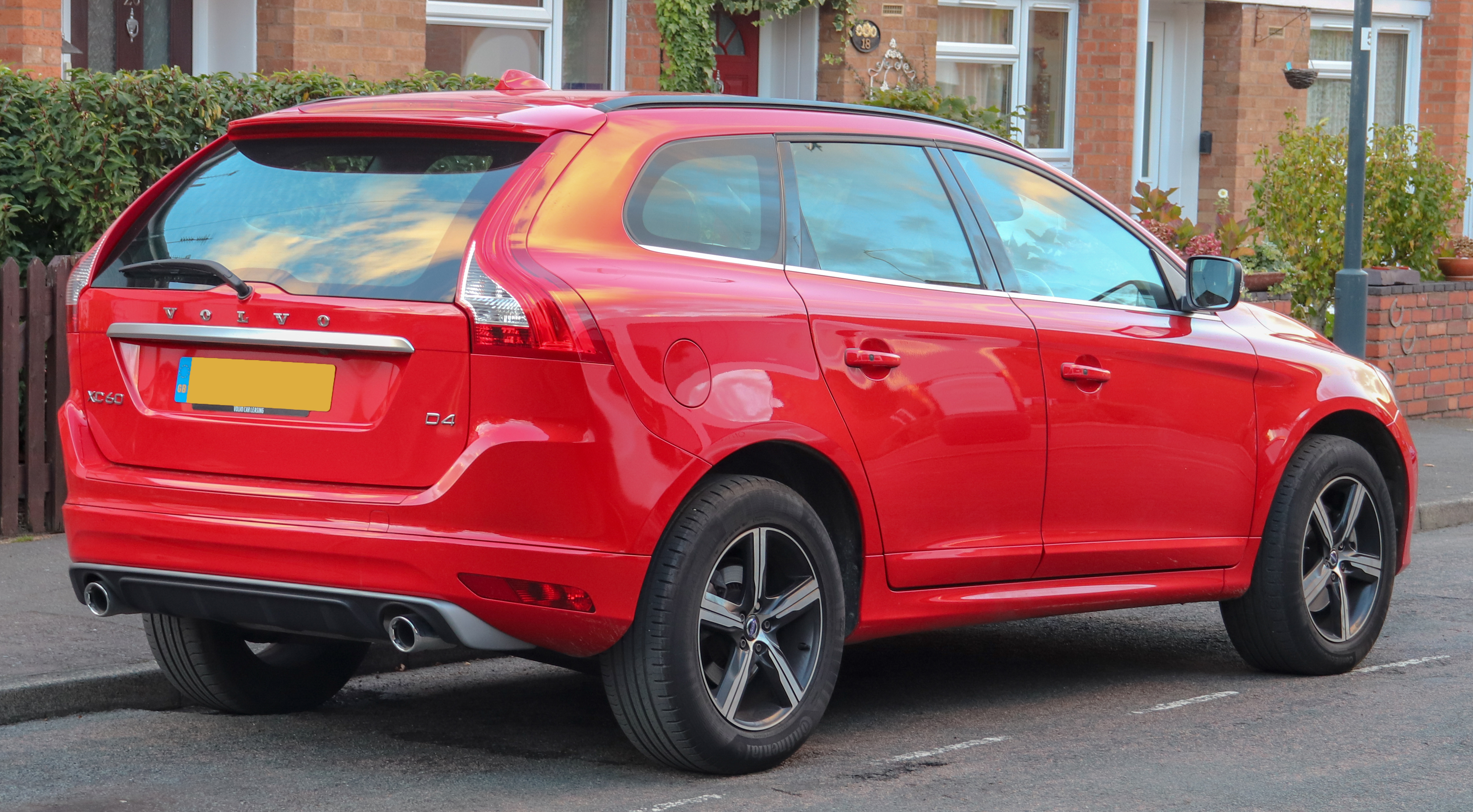
Volvo XC60 R-Design post-facelift (UK)

=== XC60 Ocean Race ===
In 2014, a special blue colour was introduced.

=== XC60 Plug-in Hybrid Concept ===
The Volvo XC60 plug-in hybrid concept was unveiled at the 2012 North American International Auto Show. The powertrain mated a 270 hp (201 kW; 274 PS) turbocharged 4-cylinder driving the front wheels with a 70 hp (52 kW; 71 PS) electric motor driving the rear wheels, giving the powertrain a peak combined output of 350 hp (261 kW; 355 PS). According to Volvo, the XC60 Plug-in Hybrid has an all-electric range of up to 35 mi (56 km) for a fuel economy equivalent of 105 mpg_{‑US} (2.2 L/100 km; 126 mpg_{‑imp}) and a total range of 600 mi (970 km). Fuel economy when running on the gasoline engine is estimated at 50 mpg_{‑US} (4.7 L/100 km; 60 mpg_{‑imp}). Recharging time is 3.5 hours from a 220 V outlet and 7.5 hours from a 110 V outlet. The model was never released for production.

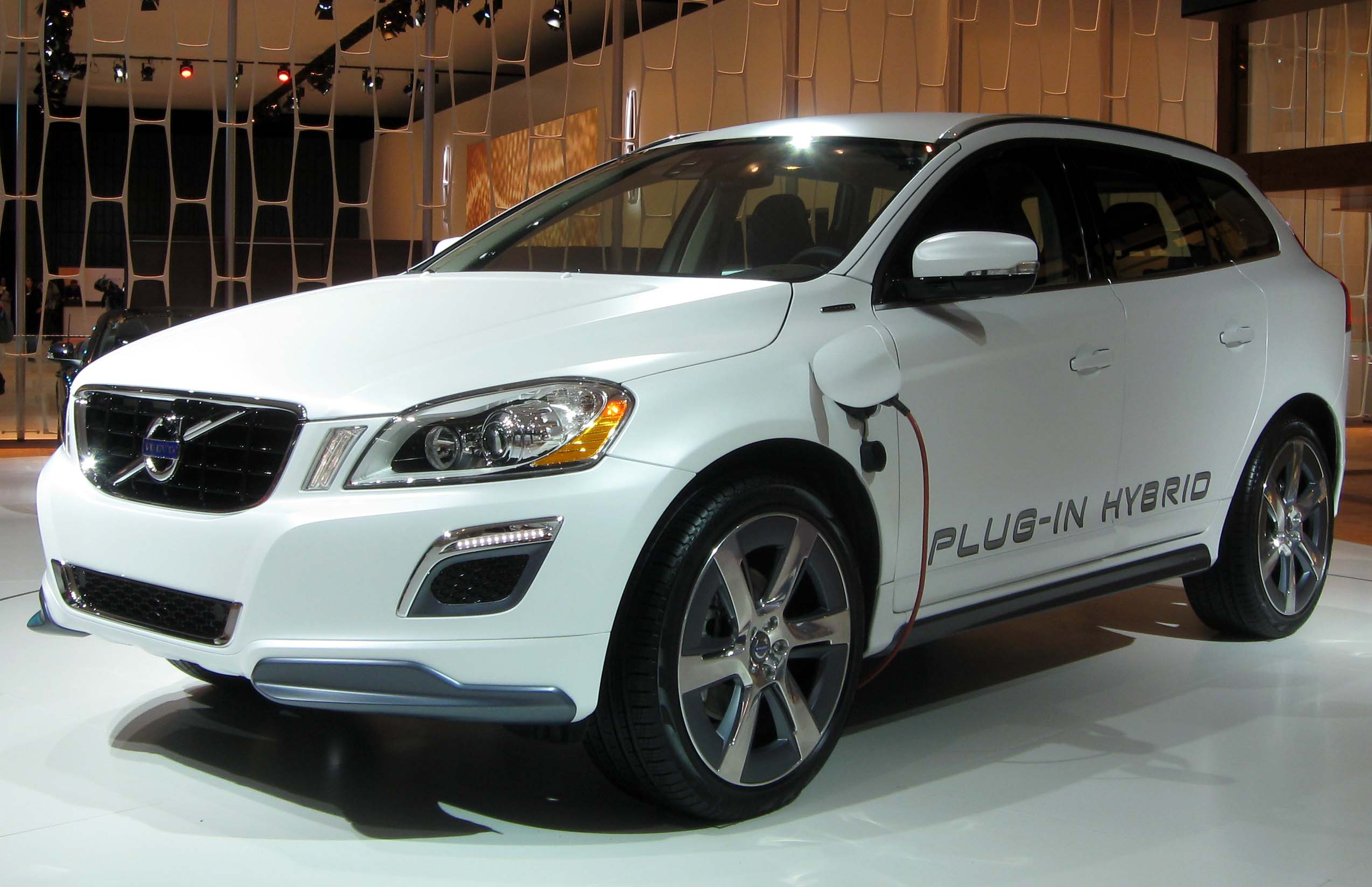
XC60 Plug-in Hybrid Concept at 2012 NYIAS

=== Engines ===
Petrol engines
Model	Year(s)	Engine Code	Power at rpm	Torque at rpm	Displacement	Comment	Fuel consumption – combined
T6 AWD	2009–2010	B6304T2	285 PS (210 kW; 281 hp) at 5600	400 N⋅m (295 lb⋅ft) at 1500–4800	2,953 cc (180.2 in^{3})	Inline 6 with turbocharger	11.9 L/100 km (20 mpg_{US})
2.0T	2010–2011	B4204T6	203 PS (149 kW; 200 hp) at 6000	300 N⋅m (221 lb⋅ft) at 1750–4000	1,999 cc (122.0 in^{3})	Inline 4 with turbocharger	8.5 L/100 km (28 mpg_{US})
3.2; 3.2 AWD	2010–2010	B6324S	238 PS (175 kW; 235 hp) at 6200	320 N⋅m (236 lb⋅ft) at 3200	3,192 cc (194.8 in^{3})	Inline 6	11.2 L/100 km (21 mpg_{US})
3.2; 3.2 AWD	2011–2014	B6324S5	243 PS (179 kW; 240 hp) at 6400	320 N⋅m (236 lb⋅ft) at 3200	3,192 cc (194.8 in^{3})	Inline 6	9.9 L/100 km (24 mpg_{US})
T6 AWD	2011–2015	B6304T4	304 PS (224 kW; 300 hp) at 5600	440 N⋅m (325 lb⋅ft) at 2100–4200	2,953 cc (180.2 in^{3})	Inline 6 with turbocharger	10.7 L/100 km (22 mpg_{US})
T6 AWD R-Design	2011–2016	B6304T4	329 PS (242 kW; 324 hp) at 5600	487 N⋅m (359 lb⋅ft) at 2100–4200	2,953 cc (180.2 in^{3})	Inline 6 with turbocharger	10.7 L/100 km (22 mpg_{US})
T5	2012–2013	B4204T7	240 PS (177 kW; 237 hp) at 5500	320 N⋅m (236 lb⋅ft) at 1800–5000	1,999 cc (122.0 in^{3})	Inline 4 with turbocharger	8.5 L/100 km (28 mpg_{US})
T5; T5 AWD	2014–2017	B4204T11	245 PS (180 kW; 242 hp) at 5500	350 N⋅m (258 lb⋅ft) at 1500–4800	1,969 cc (120.2 in^{3})	Inline 4 with turbocharger	6.7 L/100 km (35 mpg_{US})
T6; T6 AWD	2014–2017	B4204T9	306 PS (225 kW; 302 hp) at 5700	400 N⋅m (295 lb⋅ft) at 2100–4500	1,969 cc (120.2 in^{3})	Inline 4 with turbo and supercharger	7.0 L/100 km (34 mpg_{US}) for T6 7.7 L/100 km (31 mpg_{US}) for T6 AWD
T5 AWD	2015–2016	B5254T12	254 PS (187 kW; 251 hp) at 5500	360 N⋅m (266 lb⋅ft) at 1800–4200	2,497 cc (152.4 in^{3})	Inline 5 with turbocharger	8.9 L/100 km (26 mpg_{US})

Diesel engines
Model	Year(s)	Engine code	Power at rpm	Torque at rpm	Displacement	Comment	Fuel consumption – combined
D5 AWD; D5 AWD Geartronic	2009	D5244T4	185 PS (136 kW; 182 hp) at 4000	400 N⋅m (295 lb⋅ft) at 2000–2750	2,400 cc (146.5 in^{3})	Inline 5 with turbocharger	7.5 L/100 km (31 mpg_{US}) 8.3 L/100 km (28 mpg_{US}) for Geartronic
2.4D AWD	2009	D5244T5	163 PS (120 kW; 161 hp) at 4000	340 N⋅m (251 lb⋅ft) at 1750–2750	2,400 cc (146.5 in^{3})	Inline 5 with turbocharger	7.5 L/100 km (31 mpg_{US}) for manual gearbox 8.3 L/100 km (28 mpg_{US}) for automatic gearbox
D5 AWD	2010–2011	D5244T10	205 PS (151 kW; 202 hp) at 4000	420 N⋅m (310 lb⋅ft) at 1500–3250	2,400 cc (146.5 in^{3})	Inline 5 with two turbochargers	6.9 L/100 km (34 mpg_{US}) for manual gearbox 7.5 L/100 km (31 mpg_{US}) for automatic gearbox
2.4D	2010–2010	D5244T14	175 PS (129 kW; 173 hp) at 3000–4000	420 N⋅m (310 lb⋅ft) at 1500–2750	2,400 cc (146.5 in^{3})	Inline 5 with turbocharger	6 L/100 km (39 mpg_{US})
2.4D AWD (Note: Netherlands only.)	2010–2011	D5244T16	163 PS (120 kW; 161 hp) at 4000	420 N⋅m (310 lb⋅ft) at 1750–3000	2,400 cc (146.5 in^{3})	Inline 5 with turbocharger	5.7 L/100 km (41 mpg_{US}) for manual gearbox 6.8 L/100 km (35 mpg_{US}) for automatic gearbox
D3	2011–2011	D5204T2	163 PS (120 kW; 161 hp) at 3000	400 N⋅m (295 lb⋅ft) at 1400–2850	1,984 cc (121.1 in^{3})	Inline 5 with turbocharger	will be added soon
DRIVe (2012); D3 (2012); D4 (2013–2015	2012–2015	D5204T3	163 PS (120 kW; 161 hp) at 3500	400 N⋅m (295 lb⋅ft) at 1500–2760	1,984 cc (121.1 in^{3})	Inline 5 with turbocharger	will be added soon
D5 AWD	2012–2015	D5244T11	215 PS (158 kW; 212 hp) at 4000	420 N⋅m (310 lb⋅ft) at 1500–3250	2,400 cc (146.5 in^{3})	Inline 5 with two turbochargers	will be added soon
D3 AWD (2012); D4 AWD (2013–2017)	2012–2017	D5244T17	163 PS (120 kW; 161 hp) at 4000	420 N⋅m (310 lb⋅ft) at 1500–3250	2,400 cc (146.5 in^{3})	Inline 5 with turbocharger	will be added soon
D5 AWD	2012–2015	D5244T15	215 PS (158 kW; 212 hp) at 4000	440 N⋅m (325 lb⋅ft) at 1500–3000	2,400 cc (146.5 in^{3})	Inline 5 with turbocharger	will be added soon
D3; D3 AWD	2012–2015	D5204T7	136 PS (100 kW; 134 hp) at 3500	350 N⋅m (258 lb⋅ft) at 1500–2250	1,984 cc (121.1 in^{3})	Inline 5 with turbocharger	will be added soon
D4	2014–2015	D4204T5	181 PS (133 kW; 179 hp) at 4250	400 N⋅m (295 lb⋅ft) at 1740–3250	1,969 cc (120.2 in^{3})	Inline 4 with turbocharger	will be added soon
D4 AWD	2014–2014	D5244T12	181 PS (133 kW; 179 hp) at 4000	420 N⋅m (310 lb⋅ft) at 1500–2500	2,400 cc (146.5 in^{3})	Inline 5 with turbocharger	will be added soon
D3	2016–2017	D4204T4	150 PS (110 kW; 148 hp) at 4250	350 N⋅m (258 lb⋅ft) at 1500–2520	1,969 cc (120.2 in^{3})	Inline 4 with turbocharger	will be added soon
D4	2014–2017	D4204T14	190 PS (140 kW; 187 hp) at 4250	400 N⋅m (295 lb⋅ft) at 1740–3250	1,969 cc (120.2 in^{3})	Inline 4 with two turbochargers	will be added soon
D4 AWD	2016–2017	D5244T21	190 PS (140 kW; 187 hp) at 4000	420 N⋅m (310 lb⋅ft) at 1500–3000 (manual); 440 N⋅m (325 lb⋅ft) at 1500–2760 (automatic)	2,400 cc (146.5 in^{3})	Inline 5 with turbocharger	will be added soon
D5 AWD	2016–2017	D5244T22	220 PS (162 kW; 217 hp) at 4000	420 N⋅m (310 lb⋅ft) at 1500–3480	2,400 cc (146.5 in^{3})	Inline 5 with two turbochargers	will be added soon
D5 AWD	2016–2017	D5244T20	220 PS (162 kW; 217 hp) at 4000	440 N⋅m (325 lb⋅ft) at 1500–3000	2,400 cc (146.5 in^{3})	Inline 5 with two turbochargers	will be added soon

=== Safety ===
The XC60 includes traditional Volvo safety features including a whiplash protection system, side impact protection system, roll stability control, dynamic stability and traction control, inflatable curtain airbags, hill descent control (AWD only), collision warning with brake support, active bi-xenon lights (optional on some models), and patented front, side, and rear structures. The XC60 also introduced a new technology feature that Volvo has named City safety. The system is described as a driver support system with the goal of preventing or mitigating vehicle-on-vehicle collisions below 30 km/h (19 mph); it does so through the use of a closing velocity sensor that helps determine whether a collision is likely. Depending on the speed, if a collision is likely, the Volvo's computer system will either prepare the car to brake or automatically brake the vehicle to avoid or mitigate a rear-end collision.

In 2011, the Highway Loss Data Institute credited City Safety for 27% fewer property damage liability claims, 51% fewer bodily injury liability claims, and 22% fewer collision claims for the XC60 compared to other midsize luxury SUVs. The XC60 had fewer insurance claims compared to other Volvo models lacking the City Safety feature.

Euro NCAP evaluated the XC60 in 2008, awarding it 5 of 5 stars for adult occupant protection. The XC60 scored 16 of 16 points in the front test and 16 of 16 in the side test. The car received 2 of 2 points available in the pole test and an additional 3 points available for seat belt reminders. The XC60 received a total of 37 of 37 points and therefore five stars (33–37) in Euro NCAP's evaluation. The XC60 was one of only three cars to receive 37 of 37 available points under Euro NCAP's point based evaluation at the time.

The Insurance Institute for Highway Safety awarded the Volvo XC60 their Top Safety Pick+ award. The XC60 was granted the IIHS's highest rating of "good" in front, side, rear and roof strength tests and has Electronic Stability Control as standard equipment to receive the award.

==== ANCAP ====
ANCAP test results* Volvo XC60 (2009)
Test	Score
Overall	5 /5 stars
Frontal offset	15.53/16
Side impact	16/16
Pole	2/2
Seat belt reminders	3/3
Whiplash protection	Not Assessed
Pedestrian protection	Marginal
Electronic stability control	Standard

==== Euro NCAP ====
Euro NCAP 2009 XC60 AWD:
Overall	5/5 stars
Adult	94%
Pedestrian	48%

==== Insurance Institute for Highway Safety (IIHS) ====
IIHS scores:
Moderate overlap frontal offset	Good
Small overlap frontal offset (2013–present models)	Good^{1}
Side impact	Good
Roof strength	Good^{2}

^{1} vehicle structure rated "Good"
^{2} strength-to-weight ratio: 5.23

==== NHTSA ====
2011 XC60 AWD NHTSA scores
Overall:	5/5 stars
Frontal Driver:	5/5 stars
Frontal Passenger:	5/5 stars
Side Driver:	5/5 stars
Side Passenger:	5/5 stars
Side Pole Driver:	5/5 stars
Rollover:	/ 17.6%

=== Marketing ===
Volvo used the 2009 film The Twilight Saga: New Moon to promote the XC60, including an online contest to give away models identical to the one driven by lead character Edward Cullen.

== Second generation (2017–present) ==
Second generation
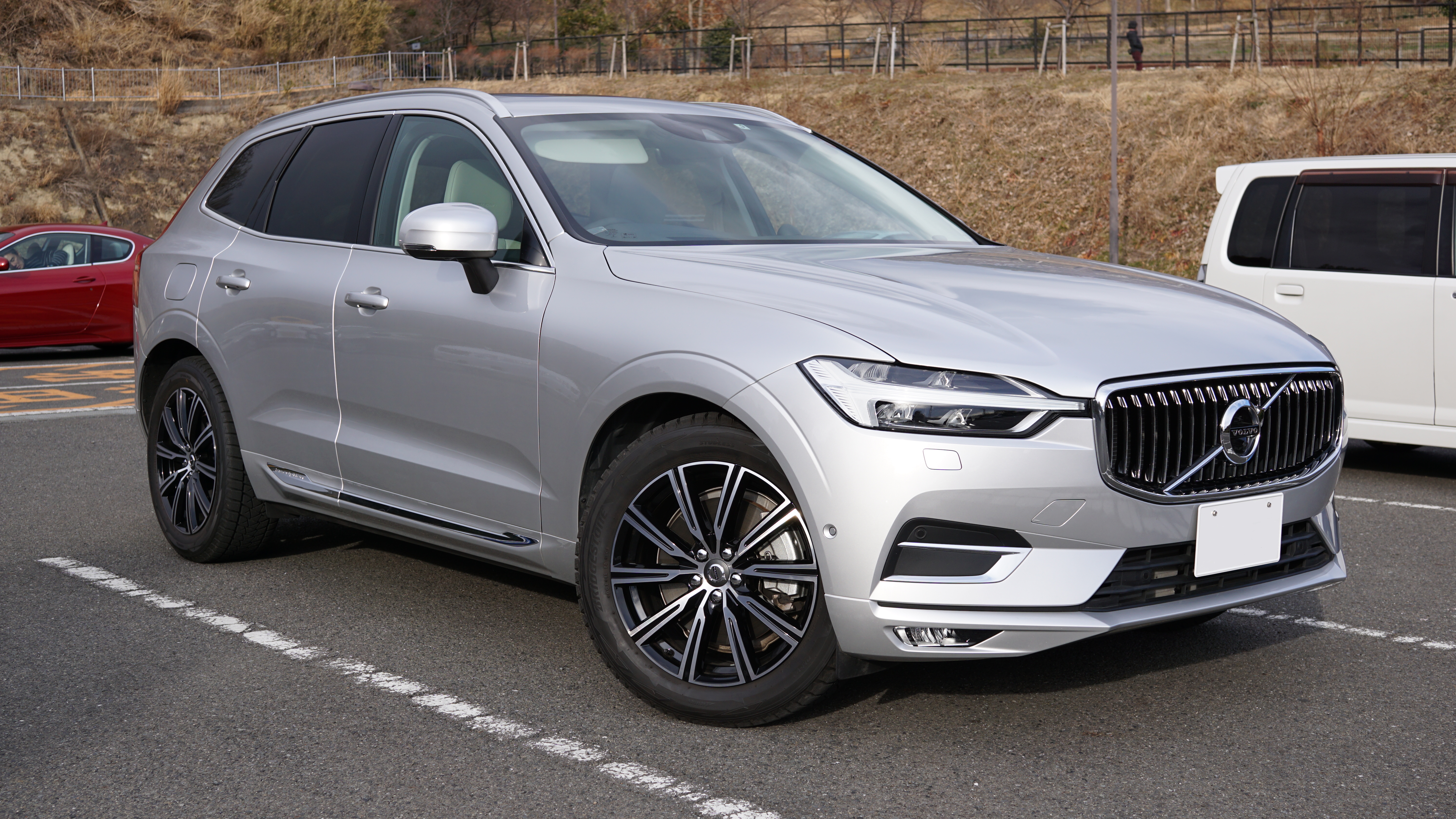
- 2018 Volvo XC60 Inscription T5 pre-facelift (Japan)

Overview
- Production: March 2017–present
- Model years: 2018–present
- Assembly: Sweden: Torslanda (Torslandaverken); Gothenburg (Polestar Performance AB); China: Chengdu (ZAMC); India: Bengaluru (Volvo Trucks); Malaysia: Shah Alam (VCMM); United States: Ridgeville, South Carolina (VCCP; beginning late 2026)
- Designer: Thomas Ingenlath

Body and chassis
- Layout: Front-engine, all-wheel-drive
- Platform: Volvo SPA platform

Powertrain
- Engine: 2.0 L B4204T I4 (petrol); (183kW–235kW); 2.0 L D4204T I4 (diesel); (140kW–173kW); 2.0 L B4204T I4 (petrol hybrid); (235kW + 64kW)
- Transmission: 6-speed Volvo M66R manual; 8-speed Aisin TG-81 SC automatic
- Hybrid drivetrain: Plug-in hybrid Mild hybrid
- Battery: 10.4 kWh (37 MJ); 11.6 kWh (42 MJ) lithium-ion
- Electric range: 45 km (28 mi) (NEDC)

Dimensions
- Wheelbase: 2,865 mm (112.8 in)
- Length: 4,688–4,708 mm (184.6–185.4 in)
- Width: 1,902 mm (74.9 in); 2,117 mm (83.3 in) with mirrors
- Height: 1,658 mm (65.3 in)
- Curb weight: 2,081–2,394 kg (4,588–5,278 lb)

The second generation XC60 was unveiled at the 2017 Geneva Motor Show. The first −60 series model in its generation and the first since Volvo's purchase by Geely, it is based on the same Scalable Product Architecture (SPA) platform as the S90, V90, and XC90. As part of Volvo's move toward smaller engines, the new model uses only four-cylinder engines, in various configurations and states of tune, again shared with the −90 series models.

The car was facelifted on 2 March 2021, with the new version debuting alongside the Volvo C40. The engines remain the same 2.0 litre with petrol, diesel, or PHEV power. Like the XC40 Recharge Electric and the C40, the XC60 facelift also gains a new Android-powered infotainment system that's been developed in collaboration with Google.

The 2024 Volvo XC60, which fell short of the Top Safety Pick+ award, received an “acceptable” rating in the updated side-impact test. The possible injuries recorded on the dummies that simulated the vehicle's occupants, especially the driver and rear passenger, were the determining factor in this rating.

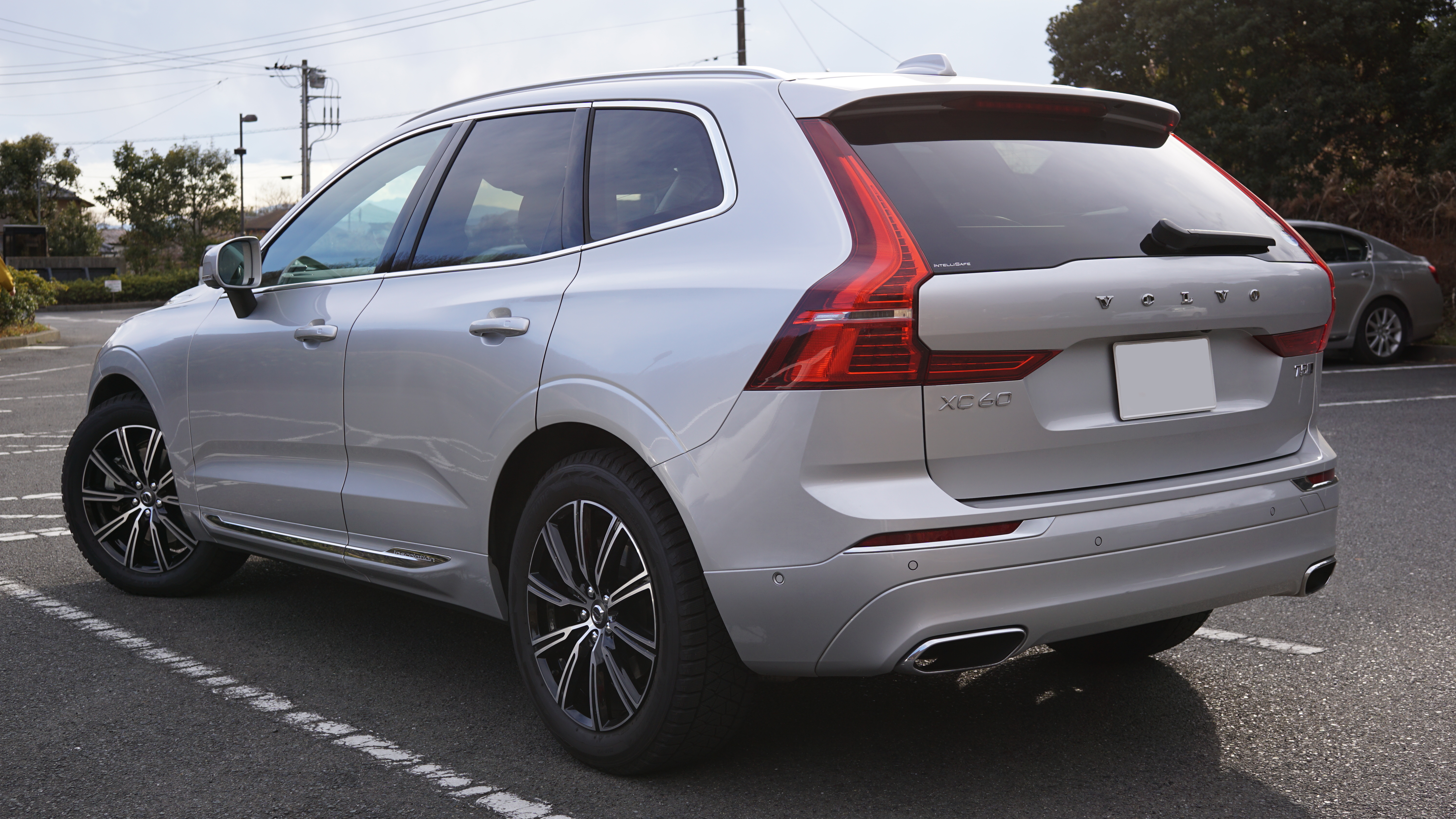
T5 AWD Inscription pre-facelift (Japan)

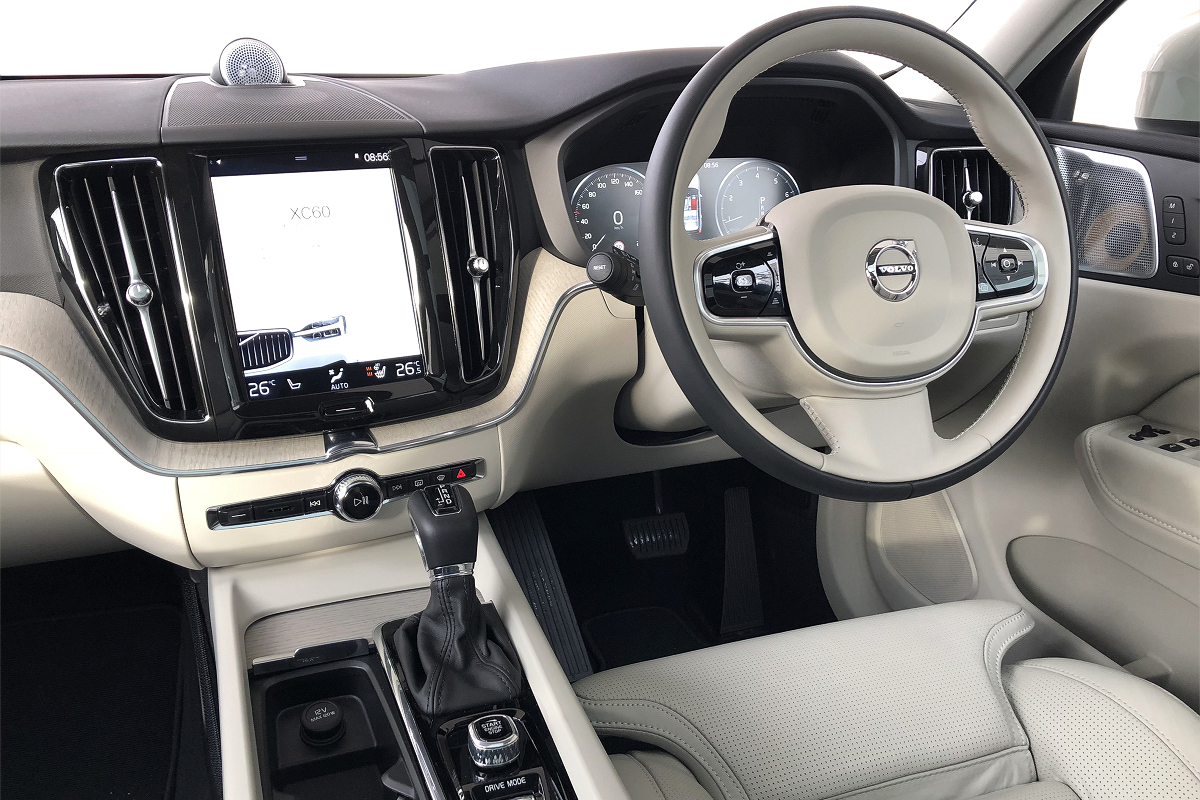
Interior of XC60 T5 AWD Inscription (Japan)

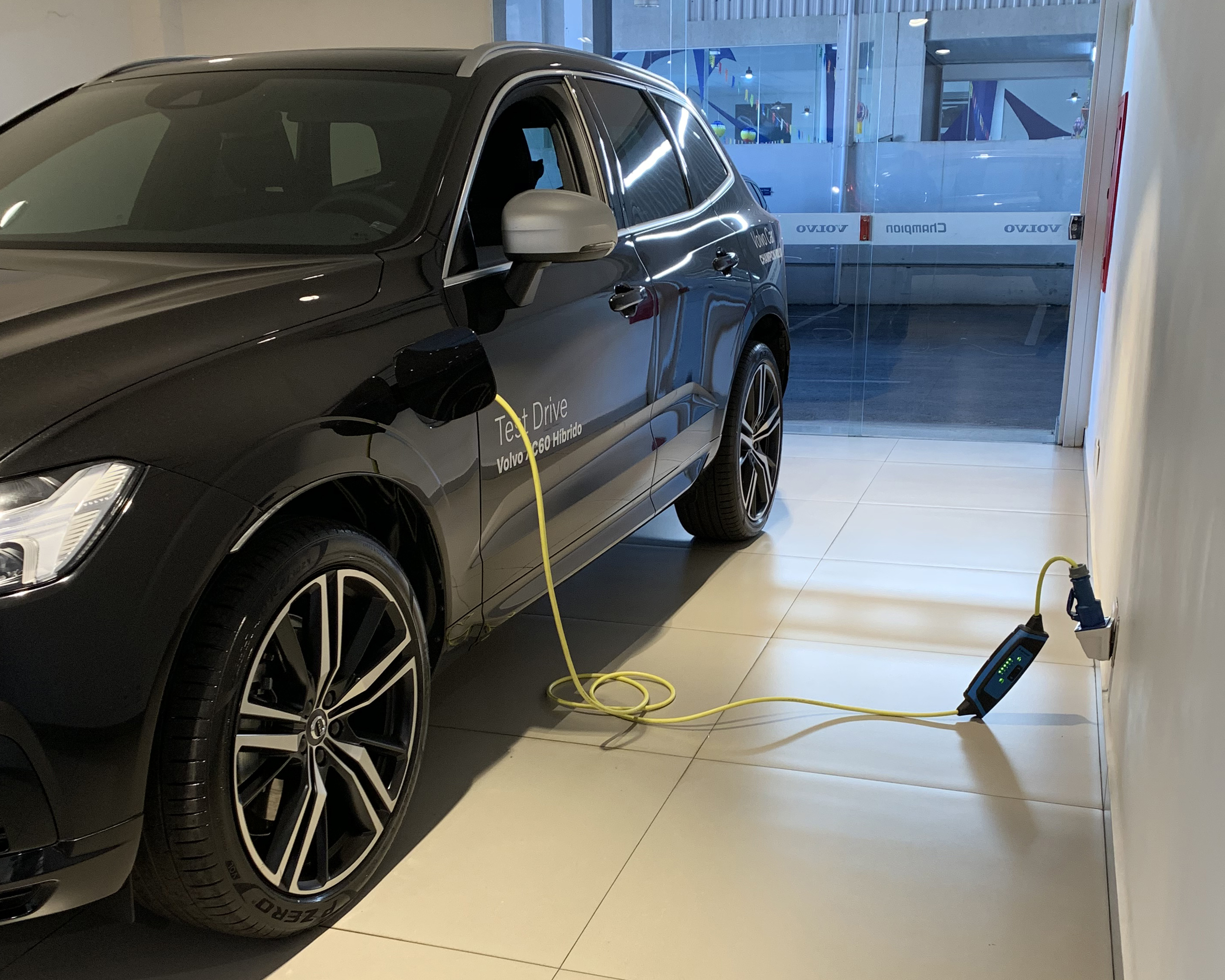
Plug-in hybrid variant charging port

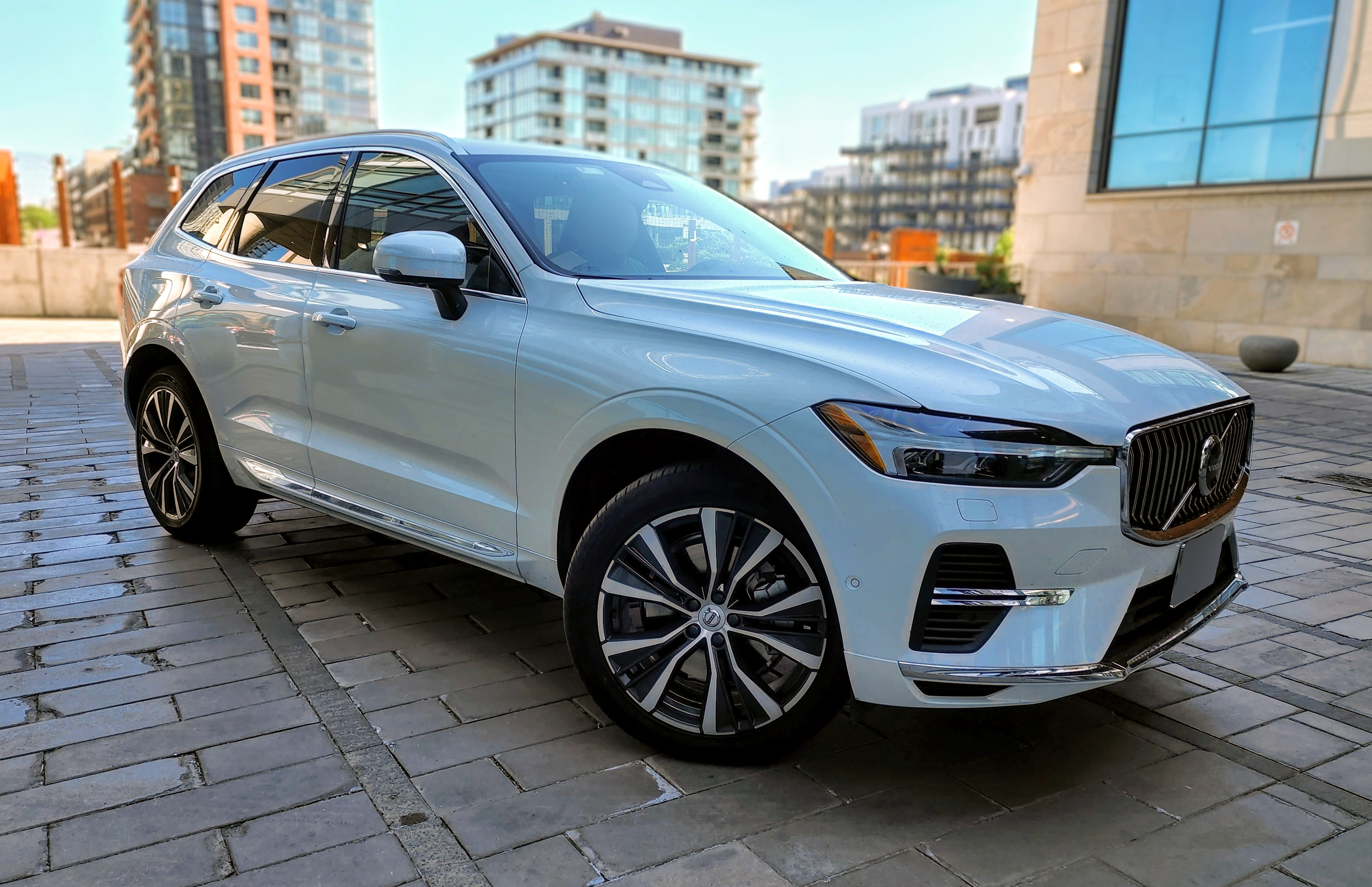
Recharge Extended Range Inscription Expression (facelift)

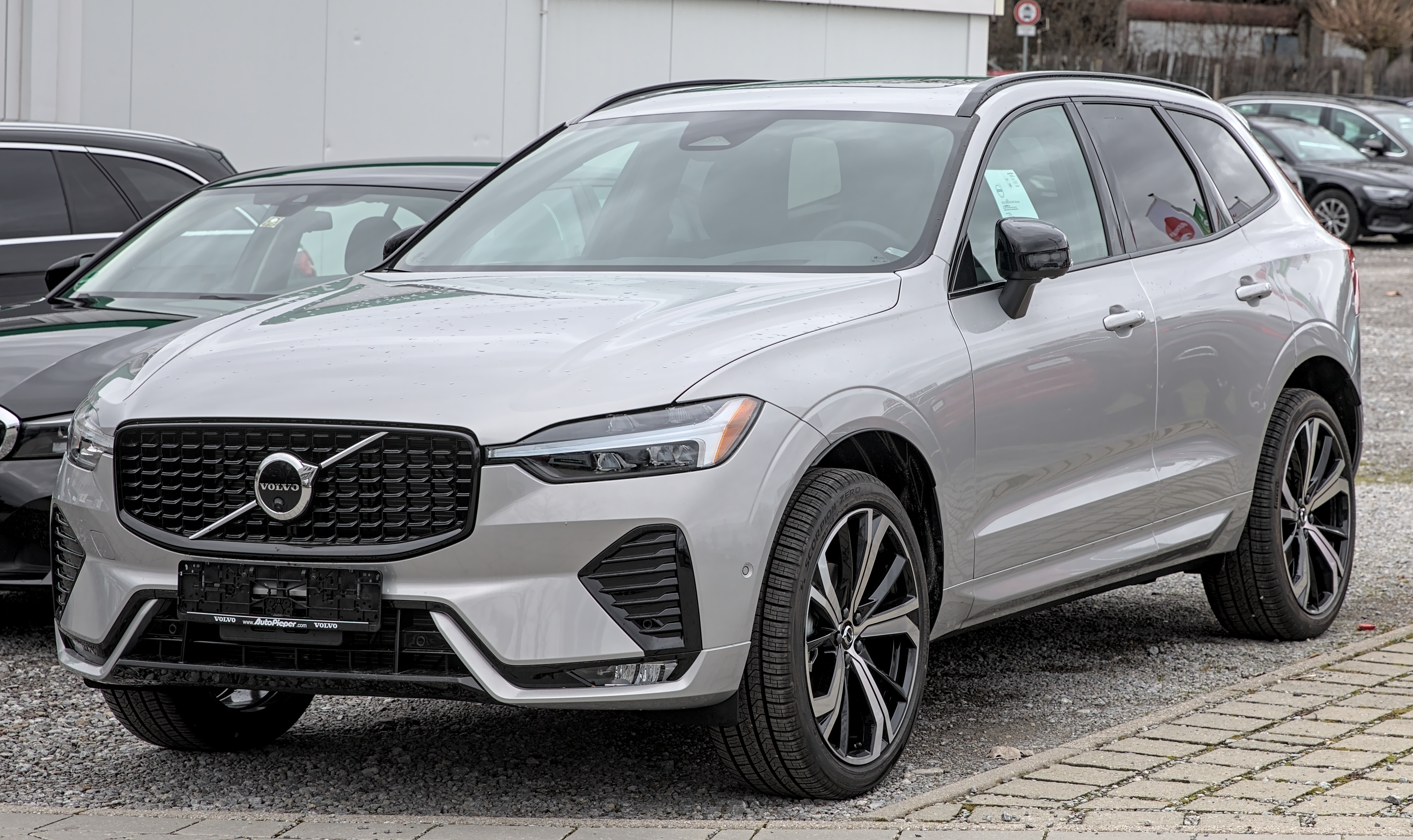
Volvo XC60 post-facelift

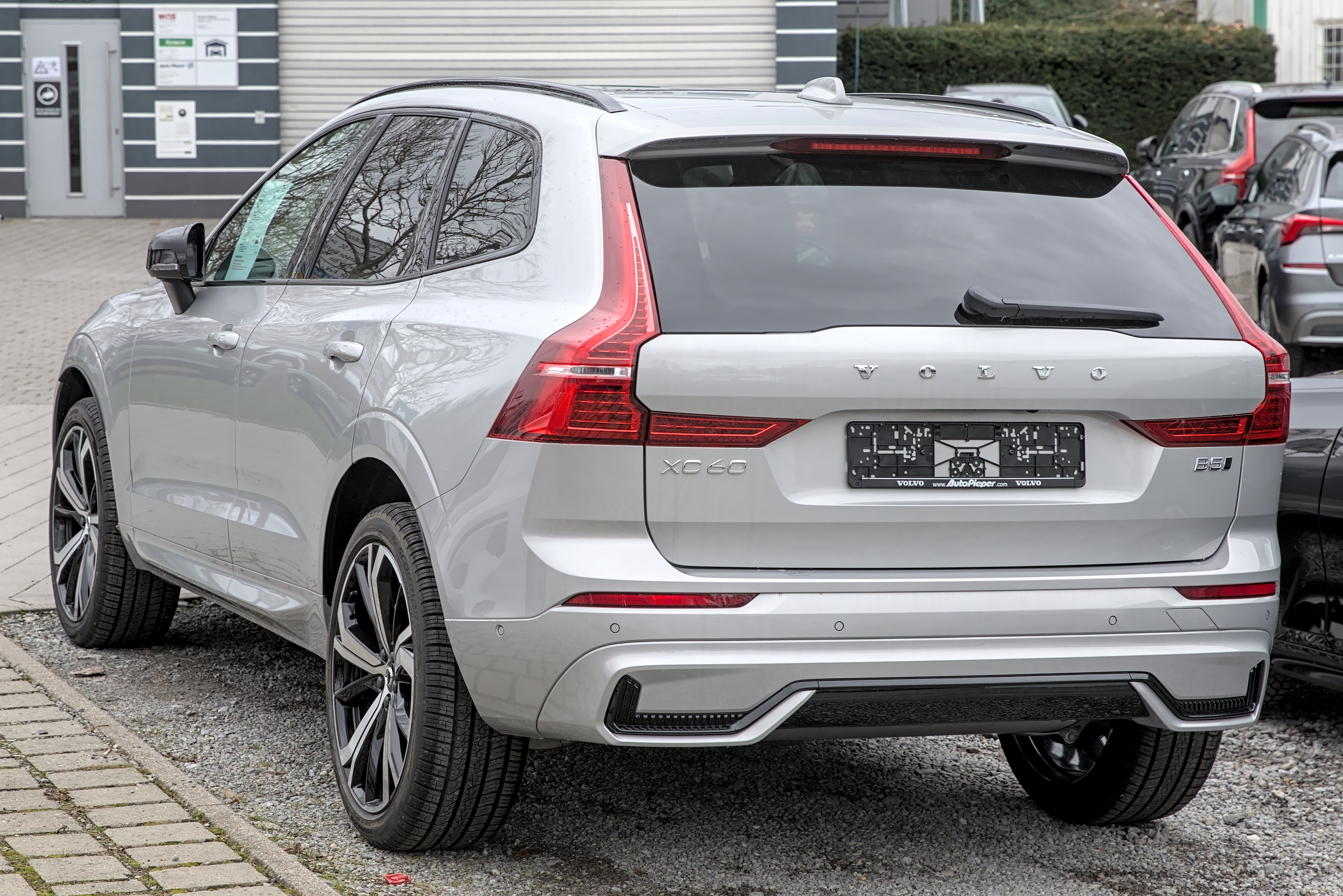
Volvo XC60 post-facelift

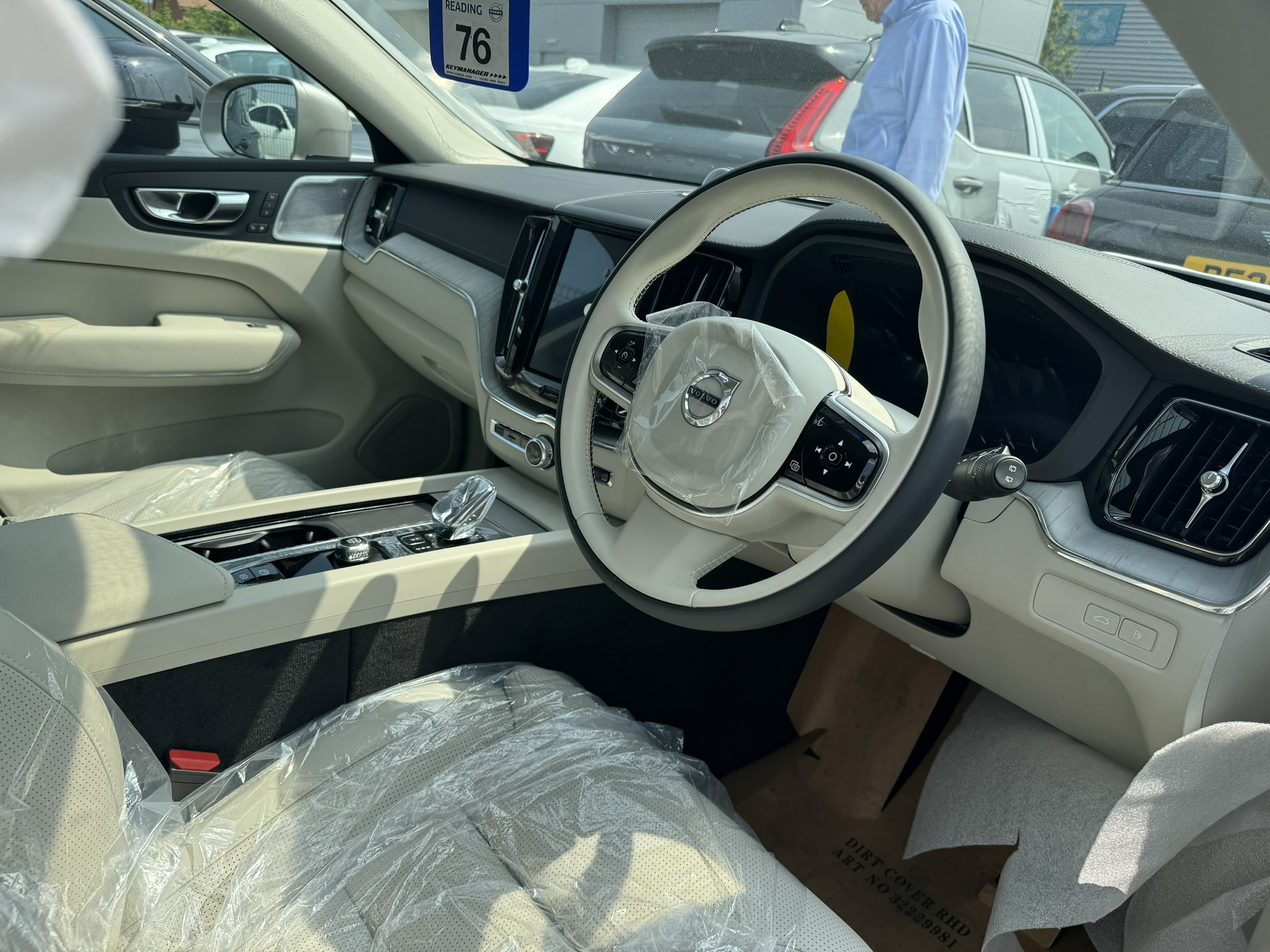
XC60 T8 Ultra (MY25) interior, showing Orrefors crystal gear shifter. Pre-delivery, with some protective film in place.

=== Mild hybrid ===
The XC60 was released with two mild hybrid variants in 2020, with both a petrol and diesel 2.0L variant available. They utilize an Integrated Starter Generator (ISG) and a KERS system In 2023, Volvo removed conventional engines as an option, meaning mild hybrids are the base engine option in the US.

=== Plug-in hybrid ===
The XC60 was released with a T8 plug-in hybrid variant that used the T6 engine combined with a 10.4 kWh battery (9.2 kWh usable) and an 87 hp (65 kW; 88 PS) rear electric motor to produce 407 hp (303 kW; 413 PS). The EPA all-electric range is 18 miles (29 km). For the 2020 model year, the battery size was increased to 11.6 kWh, which increased the EPA range to 19 miles (31 km). For the 2021 model year, T8 models were renamed to "Recharge" models.

For the 2022 model year, Volvo released an XC60 Recharge Extended Range. Battery size was increased to 18.7 kWh (14.8 kWh usable), increasing the all-electric range to 77 kilometres (48 mi). The rear electric motor was upgraded to a 142 hp (106 kW; 144 PS) unit, increasing total power output to 455 hp (339 kW; 461 PS).

=== 2026 facelift ===
In August 2025, a facelifted version of the second-generation XC60 was launched for the 2026 model year. Exterior revisions include a redesigned front grille with a criss-cross mesh pattern, smoked-effect LED tail lamps, and newly designed 19-inch alloy wheels.

Interior updates featured a larger 11.2-inch touchscreen infotainment system, an upgraded digital instrument cluster, and new upholstery options such as Nordico synthetic leather. In the Indian market, the facelifted model was offered in a single fully equipped Ultra trim, which added features including a front seat massage function and additional soft-touch materials and the price increased to : ₹ 71.9 Lakhs which was : ₹ 1.15 Lakhs more than the pre-facelift model.

No mechanical changes were introduced with the update. The model continued to be powered by a 2.0-litre turbocharged petrol engine paired with a 48V mild-hybrid system, producing 250 hp and 360 Nm of torque. An 8-speed automatic transmission and all-wheel drive remained standard across the range. Plug-in hybrid variants retained their pre-facelift powertrain specifications.

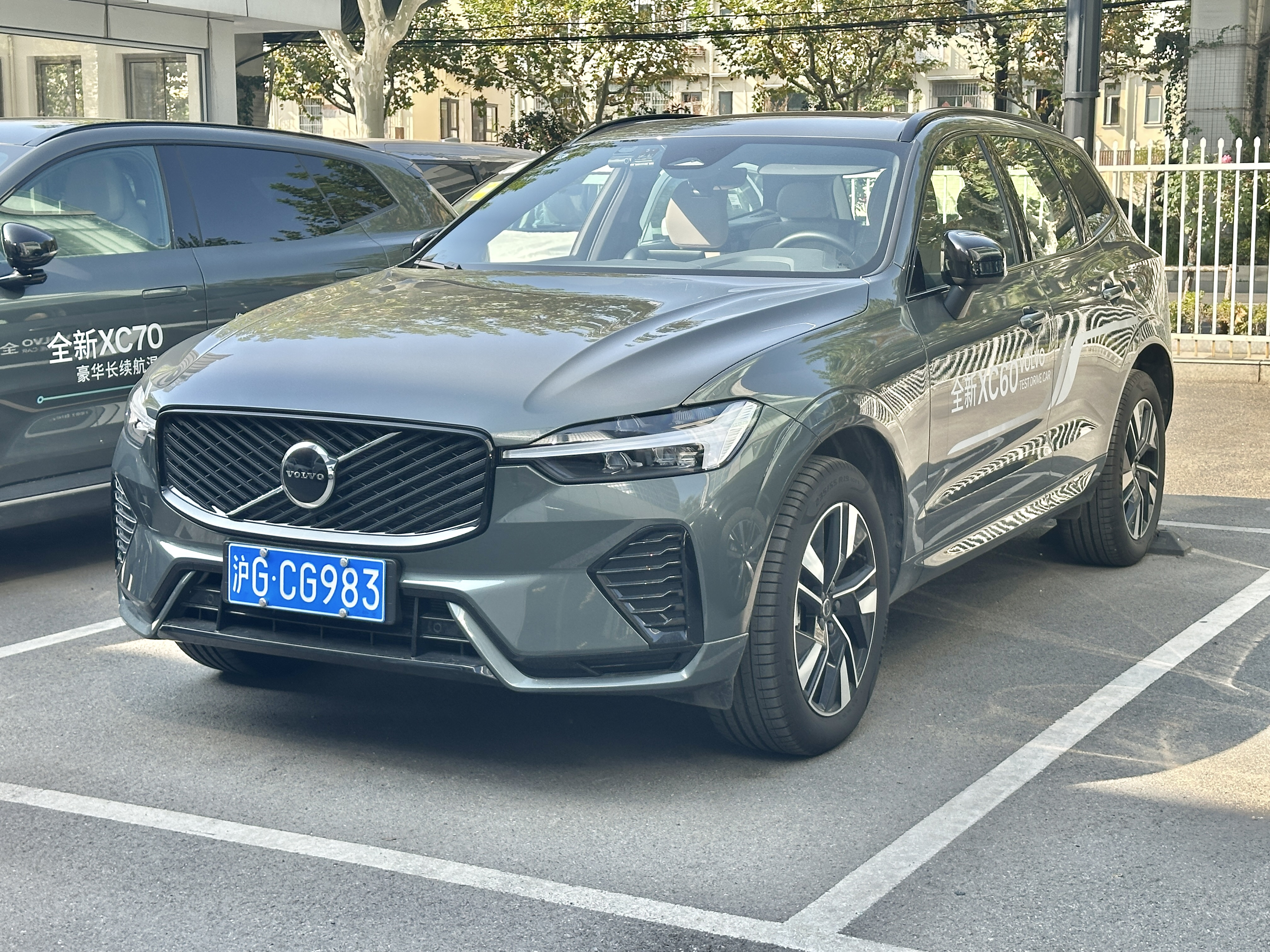
2025 facelift

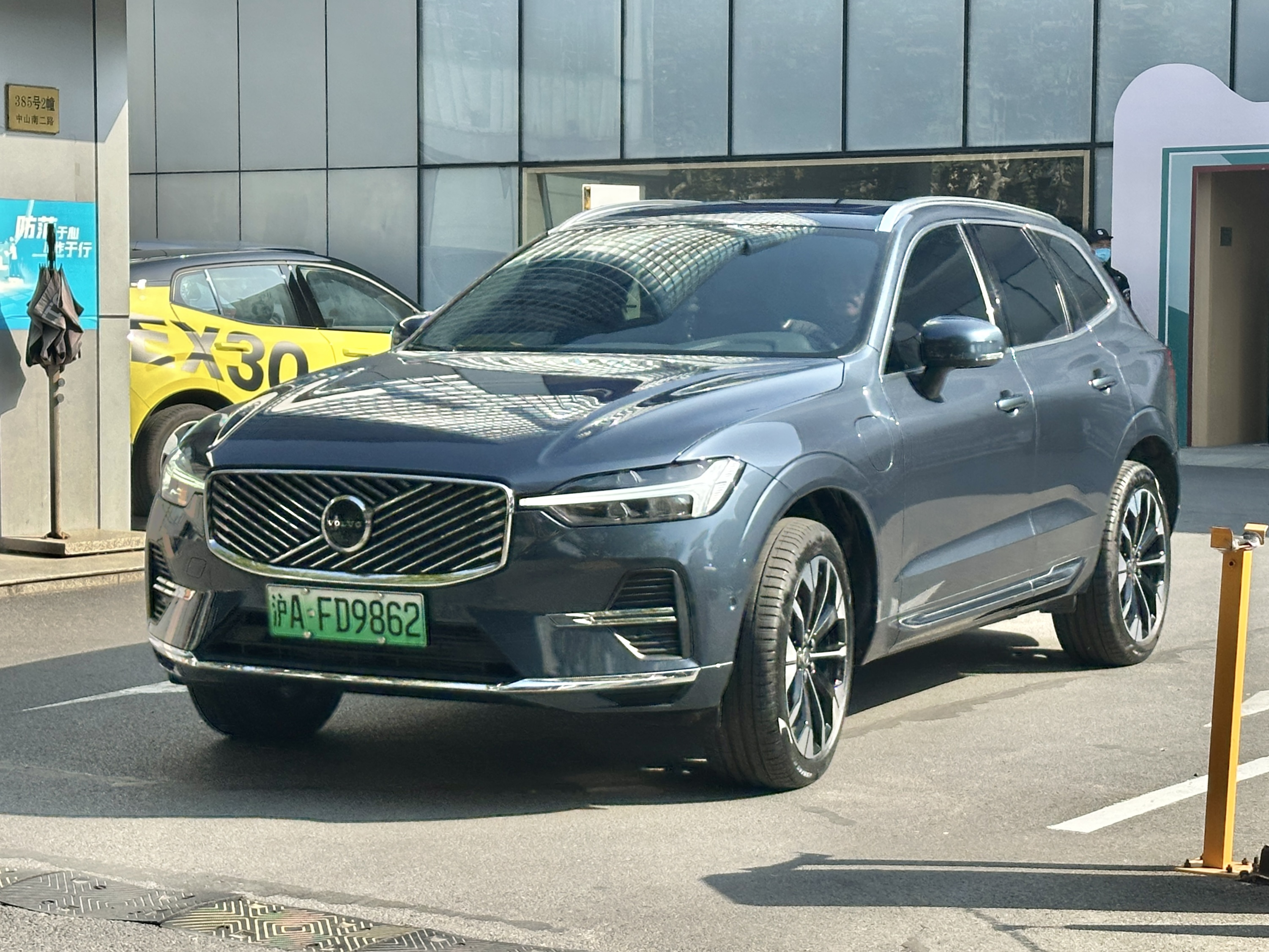
PHEV 2025 facelift

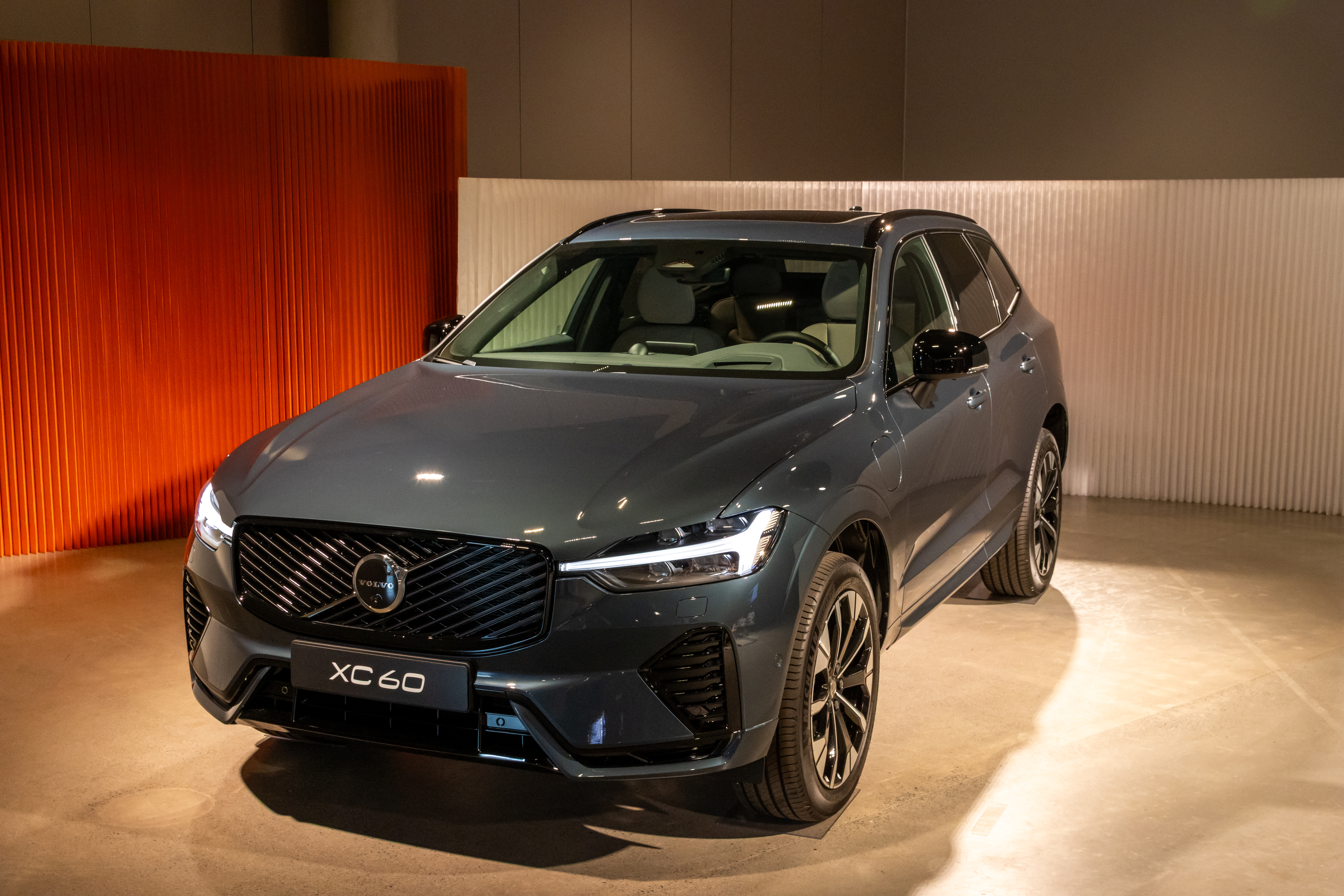
Exterior

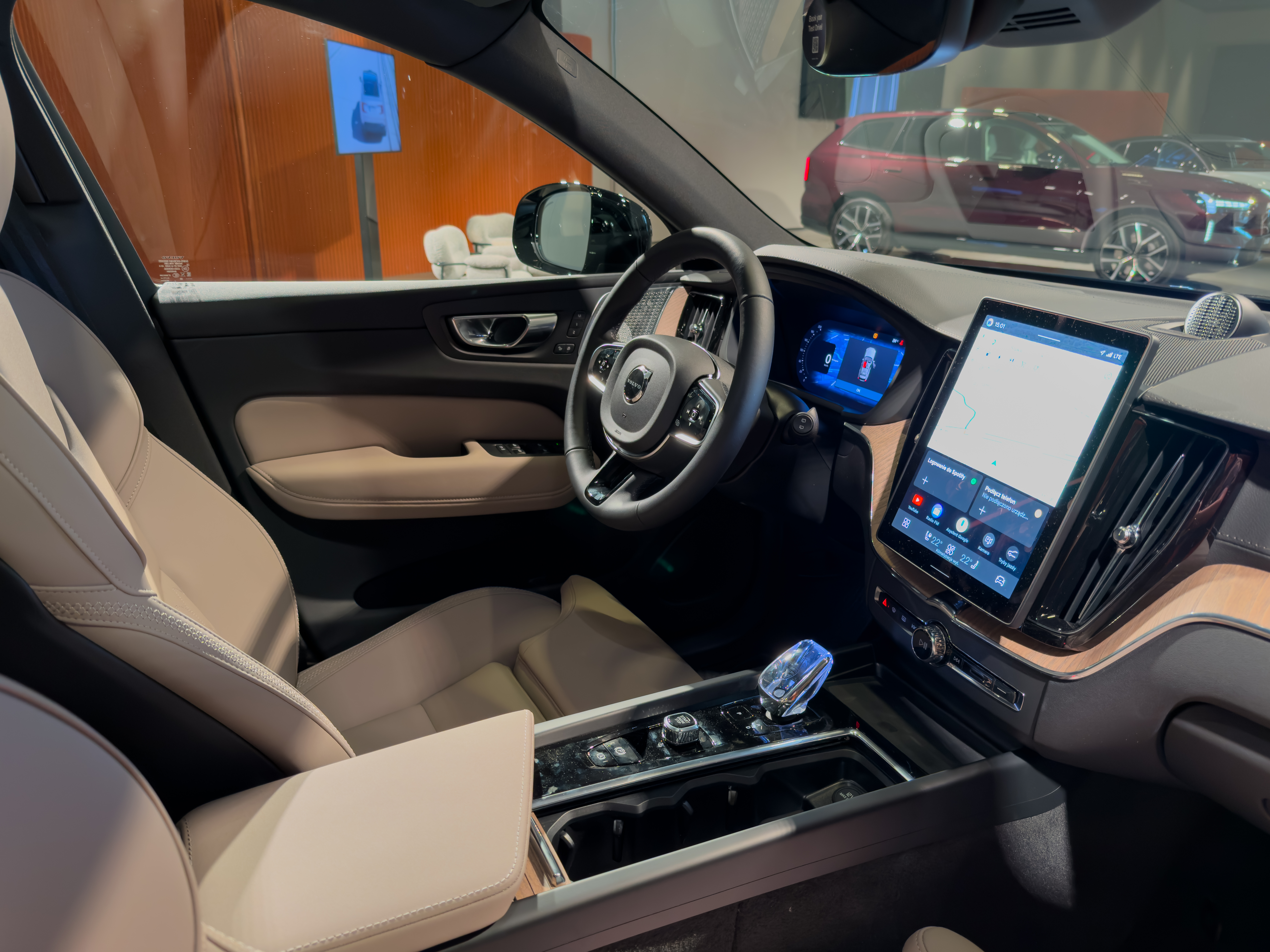
Interior

=== 2028 facelift ===
On 15 September 2026, a second facelift for the second generation XC60 was revealed for the 2028 model year. The front fascia was redesigned, including an updated grille and bumper, and reshaped Thor's hammer headlights with new matrix LEDs. The tailgate and rear light signature was also updated. Additionally, a new color "Heather Bronze" and new 20 to 21-inch wheel options are available. The interior remains largely carried over, though materials surrounding the air vents and in the door panel have been updated, while soft ambient lighting is also added. In terms of safety, this facelift adds new ultrasonic and radar sensors to the front bumpers, with additional cameras that allow for a movable 360 degree camera view.

While most powertrains are unchanged, the plug-in hybrid T8 powertrain has been significantly overhauled. The engine and electric motors produce a combined 455 hp (339 kW; 461 PS), which is identical as its predecessor, though power distribution is shifted towards stronger motors, while a less powerful engine is used. The structure has been modified to fit a new flat-mounted high-voltage 41.2 kWh battery, providing up to 78 miles (126 kilometres) of range without affecting ground clearance or interior space. The peak charging power has also been increased to 7.2 kW (from 3.6 kW), requiring 6 hours to charge from 0-100%.

2028 facelift

2028 facelift

=== Asia Markets ===
Volvos sold in Indonesia, the Philippines, Taiwan, Thailand, and Vietnam are all imported from Malaysia's Volvo factory in Shah Alam.

=== Trim levels ===
The XC60 is available in Core, Plus, and Ultimate as of 2023 name changes.

=== Engines ===
Petrol engines
Model	Engine code	Year(s)	Power at rpm	Torque at rpm	Displacement	Comment
T4	B4204T44	2018–2021	190 PS (140 kW; 187 hp) at 5000	350 N⋅m (258 lb⋅ft) at 1400–4000	1,969 cc (120.2 in^{3})	Inline 4 with turbocharger
T5; T5 AWD	B4204T26	2017–2021	250 PS (184 kW; 247 hp) at 5500	350 N⋅m (258 lb⋅ft) at 1800–4800	1,969 cc (120.2 in^{3})	Inline 4 with turbocharger
T5 AWD	B4204T20	2017–2021	249 PS (183 kW; 246 hp) at 5500	350 N⋅m (258 lb⋅ft) at 1500–4500	1,969 cc (120.2 in^{3})	Inline 4 with turbocharger
T5 AWD	B4204T23	2017–2021	254 PS (187 kW; 251 hp) at 5500	350 N⋅m (258 lb⋅ft) at 1500–4800	1,969 cc (120.2 in^{3})	Inline 4 with turbocharger
T6 AWD	B4204T27	2017–2021	320 PS (235 kW; 316 hp) at 5700	400 N⋅m (295 lb⋅ft) at 2200–5400	1,969 cc (120.2 in^{3})	Inline 4 with turbocharger and supercharger
T6 AWD	B4204T29	2017–2021	310 PS (228 kW; 306 hp) at 5700	400 N⋅m (295 lb⋅ft) at 2200–5400	1,969 cc (120.2 in^{3})	Inline 4 with turbocharger and supercharger

Diesel engines
Model	Engine code	Year(s)	Power at rpm	Torque at rpm	Displacement	Comment
D4 AWD	D4204T14	2017–present	190 PS (140 kW; 187 hp) at 4250	400 N⋅m (295 lb⋅ft) at 1750–2500	1,969 cc (120.2 in^{3})	Inline 4 with two turbochargers
D5 AWD	D4204T23	2017–present	235 PS (173 kW; 232 hp) at 4000	480 N⋅m (354 lb⋅ft) at 1750–2250	1,969 cc (120.2 in^{3})	Inline 4 with two turbochargers, 2nd one being a variable geometry turbocharger

Hybrid engines
Model	Engine code	Year(s)	Power at rpm	Torque at rpm	Displacement	Comment
T8 AWD; T8 Twin Engine	B4204T28	2017–2021	318 PS (234 kW; 314 hp) at 6000; + 87 PS (64 kW; 86 hp) electric	400 N⋅m (295 lb⋅ft) at 2200–5400; + 240 N⋅m (177 lb⋅ft) electric	1,969 cc (120.2 in^{3})	Inline 4 with turbocharger and supercharger; + electric motor driving the rear wheels
T8 AWD; T8 Twin Engine	B4204T35	2017–2021	320 PS (235 kW; 316 hp) at 5700; + 87 PS (64 kW; 86 hp) electric	400 N⋅m (295 lb⋅ft) at 2200–5400; + 240 N⋅m (177 lb⋅ft) electric	1,969 cc (120.2 in^{3})	Inline 4 with turbocharger and supercharger; + electric motor driving the rear wheels
T8 eAWD; T8 Twin Engine; T8 Polestar Engineered	B4204T34	2018–2021	320 PS (235 kW; 316 hp) at 5700; + 87 PS (64 kW; 86 hp) electric	400 N⋅m (295 lb⋅ft) at 2200–5400; + 240 N⋅m (177 lb⋅ft) electric	1,969 cc (120.2 in^{3})	Inline 4 with turbocharger and supercharger; + electric motor driving the rear wheels
All T8 Recharge models	B4204TSH	2022–present	317 PS (233 kW; 313 hp) at 6000; + 144 PS (106 kW; 142 hp) electric	400 N⋅m (295 lb⋅ft) at 3000–5400; + 240 N⋅m (177 lb⋅ft) electric	1,969 cc (120.2 in^{3})	Inline 4 with turbocharger; + electric motor driving the rear wheels

=== Safety ===
The XC60 earned the IIHS's Top Safety Pick for 2018, 2019, 2020, 2023 and 2024, and earned Top Safety Pick+ for 2021 and 2022.

2018 Volvo XC60 IIHS Ratings
Category	Rating
Small overlap front	Good
Moderate overlap front	Good
Side impact (updated test)	Acceptable
Roof strength	Good
Head restraints & seats	Good

ANCAP test results* Volvo XC60 B5, B6, D4, D5, T5 and T6 variants (2017, aligned with Euro NCAP)
Test	Points	%
Overall:	5 /5 stars	
Adult occupant:	37.2	98%
Child occupant:	42.8	85%
Pedestrian:	31.9	76%
Safety assist:	11.4	95%

== Sales ==
The Volvo XC60 has been Volvo's best selling car, with sales increasing every year since its release in 2008. The second generation XC60 (released in 2017) has continued to set new sales records.

Retail sales volume
Calendar year	United States	Canada	Brazil	Europe	China			Global
Calendar year	United States	Canada	Brazil	Europe	XC60	PHEV	Total	
2008	—N/a	—N/a	—N/a	5,842	—		—N/a	6,954
2009	9,262	1,211	1,540	40,075	—		—N/a	61,667
2010	12,030	1,540	1,697	44,995	—		—N/a	80,723
2011	12,932	1,865	3,474	51,345	—		—N/a	97,183
2012	19,139	1,885	2,414	46,410	—		—N/a	106,203
2013	19,766	1,681	2,088	46,185	—		—N/a	114,010
2014	19,276	1,542	2,156	62,845		—	6,874	136,993
2015	26,134	1,646	2,543	77,197		—	36,634	159,617
2016	20,452	1,526	2,144	82,990		—	39,374	161,092
2017	22,516	2,315	2,350	99,023		—	38,672	184,966
2018	32,689	2,826	2,916	80,000			50,237	189,459
2019	30,578	3,045	3,442	81,876			62,594	204,981
2020	32,078	3,148	2,951	70,533			62,739	191,696
2021	41,582	3,398	3,466	73,165			62,431	215,636
2022	36,181		1,882	64,689			67,944	195,338
2023	39,702		4,335		61,562	5,942	67,504	228,646
2024	38,892		3,266		61,503	7,044	68,547	230,853
2025	41,105		3,515		60,079	5,973	66,052	
