= Volvo SI6 engine =

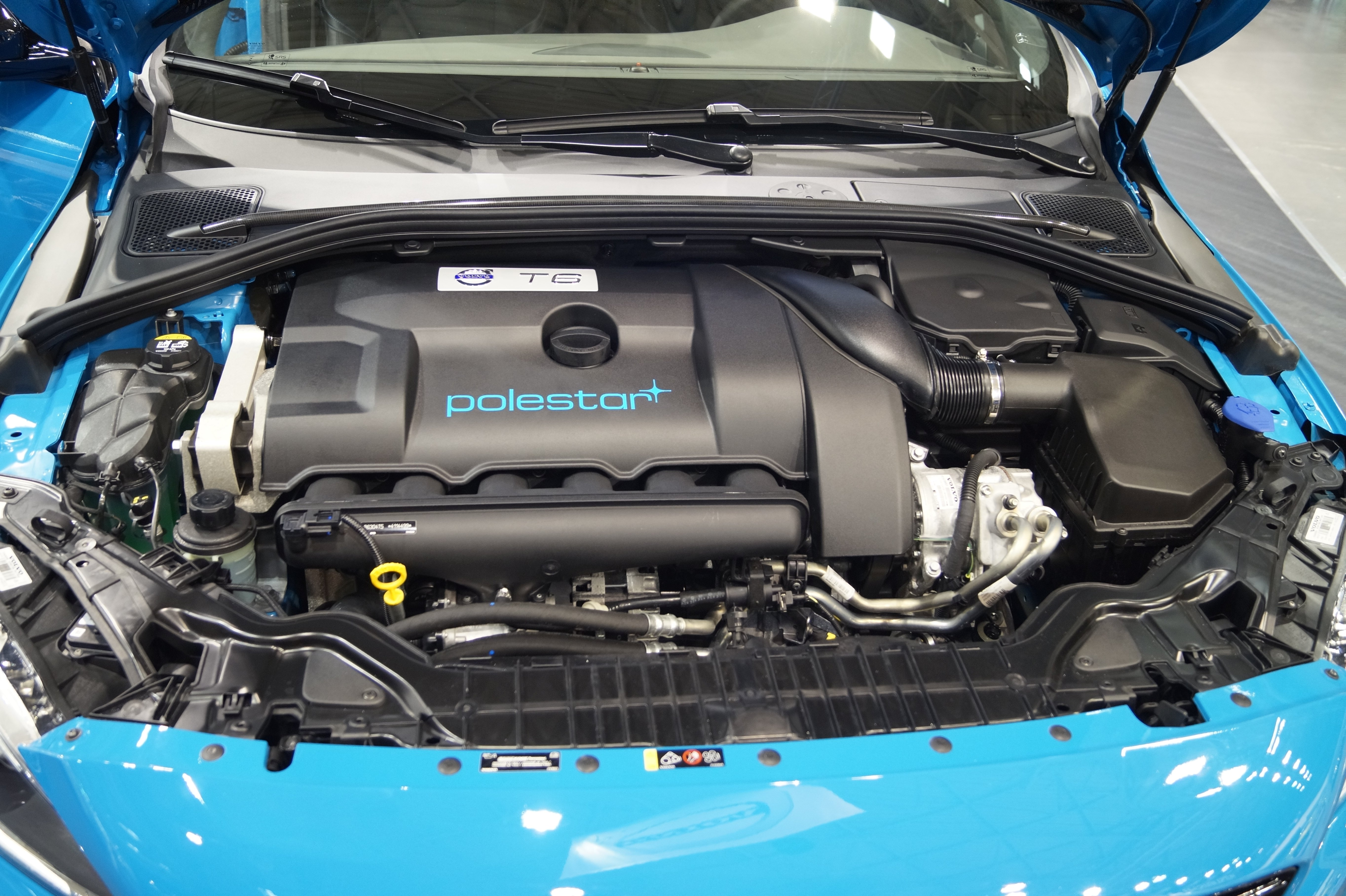

Overview
- Manufacturer: Volvo Cars/Ford Motor Company
- Production: 2006–2015

Layout
- Configuration: I6
- Displacement: 3.0–3.2 L (2,953–3,192 cc)
- Cylinder bore: 82 mm (3.23 in); 84 mm (3.31 in)
- Piston stroke: 93.2 mm (3.67 in); 96 mm (3.78 in)
- Cylinder block material: Aluminum
- Cylinder head material: Aluminum
- Valvetrain: DOHC 4 valves x cyl. with VVT and VVL
- Compression ratio: 9.3:1, 10.8:1

Combustion
- Turbocharger: Low pressure with intercooler (on 3.0 L versions)
- Fuel system: Fuel injection
- Management: Bosch ME
- Fuel type: Petrol
- Oil system: Wet sump
- Cooling system: Water-cooled

Output
- Power output: 171–257 kW; 230–345 hp (233–350 PS)
- Torque output: 300–500 N⋅m (221–369 lb⋅ft)

Dimensions
- Dry weight: 190 kg (420 lb)

Emissions
- Emissions target standard: Euro 4; Euro 5+; Euro 6; ULEV II; SULEV
- Emissions control systems: Catalytic converter

Chronology
- Predecessor: Volvo Modular B6 Engine
- Successor: VEA Twincharged

The SI6 (Short Inline 6) is a family of straight-six engines developed by Volvo and used by Land Rover and Volvo.

== History ==
Volvo designed the SI6 ("Short Inline 6") straight-six automobile engine for use in 2007 models. An evolution of the company's long-used straight-five Modular engine, which itself was an evolution of the Volvo B6304 straight-six engine, the SI6 can be mounted transversely for front wheel drive or all wheel drive applications. Despite the added cylinder and displacement, the engine remains compact, and is in fact 1 mm (0.039 in) shorter than the original straight-five. The engine was initially offered in two displacements — a 3-litre turbocharged version and a 3.2-litre naturally aspirated version. Both offered variable cam timing, though only the turbo version varies both the intake and exhaust valves. On top of the variable cam timing used on the intake cam of the naturally aspirated engine it also had variable valve lift by using Cam Profile Switching (CPS).

Production of the Volvo SI6 began at the Ford Bridgend Engine Plant in Wales in May 2006. It was assumed that the engines would be used in European Ford and Jaguar products as well as Volvos.

=== Nomenclature ===
The engine codes consist of a series of letters and digits:

- 1st: Fuel type (B) B = Bensin (Petrol)
- 2nd: Number of cylinders (6)
- 3rd & 4th: Approximate displacement in deciliters, may be rounded up or down
- 5th: Valves per cylinder (4)
- 6th: Induction method (S/T) S = suction (naturally aspirated), T = turbocharged
- 7th: Engine variant (2/4/5)

Engine codes are not necessarily unique to a specific engine as power levels can vary depending on market, manufacturer and model.

== 3.0 ==
The initial, 3.0 L (2,953 cc) straight-six engine is intercooled and turbocharged. Cylinder bore and stroke are 82 mm × 93.2 mm (3.23 in × 3.67 in) with a compression ratio of 9.3:1.

=== B6304T2 ===
The B6304T2 has a power output of 285 PS (210 kW; 281 hp) at 5600 rpm, and produces 400 N⋅m (295 lb⋅ft) of torque at 1500–4800 rpm.

Applications:

- 2008–2010 Volvo S80 II badged as S80 T6 or S80 T6 AWD
- 2008–2010 Volvo S80L badged as S80L T6 or S80L T6 AWD
- 2008–2010 Volvo V70 III badged as V70 T6 or V70 T6 AWD
- 2009–2010 Volvo XC70 II badged as XC70 T6 or XC70 T6 AWD
- 2009–2010 Volvo XC60 badged as XC60 T6 or XC60 T6 AWD

=== B6304T4 ===
The B6304T4 has a power output of 304 PS (224 kW; 300 hp) at 5600 rpm, and produces 440 N⋅m (325 lb⋅ft) of torque at 2100–4200 rpm.

Applications:

- 2011–2015 Volvo S80 II badged as S80 T6 or S80 T6 AWD
- 2011–2015 Volvo V70 III badged as V70 T6 or V70 T6 AWD
- 2011–2015 Volvo XC70 II badged as XC70 T6 or XC70 T6 AWD
- 2011–2016 Volvo XC60 badged as XC60 T6 or XC60 T6 AWD
- 2011–2015 Volvo S60 II badged as S60 T6 or S60 T6 AWD
- 2011–2018 Volvo V60 badged as V60 T6 or V60 T6 AWD

=== B6304T5 ===
The B6304T5 has a power output of 350 PS (257 kW; 345 hp) at 5250 rpm, and produces 500 N⋅m (369 lb⋅ft) of torque at 3000–4750 rpm.

Applications:

- 2014–2016 Volvo S60 II badged as S60 Polestar
- 2015–2016 Volvo V60 badged as V60 Polestar

== 3.2 ==
The 3.2 L (3,192 cc) straight-six engine is naturally aspirated. Cylinder bore and stroke are 84 mm × 96 mm (3.31 in × 3.78 in) with a compression ratio of 10.8:1.

=== B6324S ===
The B6324S has a power output of 238 PS (175 kW; 235 hp) at 6200 rpm, and produces 320 N⋅m (236 lb⋅ft) of torque at 3200 rpm.

Applications:

- 2007–2010 Volvo XC90 badged as XC90 3.2
- 2007–2010 Volvo S80 II badged as S80 3.2 or S80 3.2 AWD
- 2008–2010 Volvo V70 III badged as V70 3.2 or V70 3.2 AWD
- 2008–2010 Volvo XC70 II badged as XC70 3.2
- 2010 Volvo XC60 badged as XC60 3.2 AWD

=== B6324S2 ===
The B6324S2 has a power output of 228 PS (168 kW; 225 hp) at 6200 rpm, and produces 300 N⋅m (221 lb⋅ft) of torque at 3200 rpm. Applications:

- 2010 Volvo S80 II badged as S80 3.2
- 2010 Volvo XC70 II badged as XC70 3.2
- 2010 Volvo XC60 badged as XC60 3.2

=== B6324S4 ===
The B6324S4 has a power output of 241 PS (177 kW; 238 hp) at 6200 rpm, and produces 320 N⋅m (236 lb⋅ft) of torque at 3200 rpm.

Applications:

- 2011–2014 Volvo S80 II badged as S80 3.2
- –2014 Volvo XC70 II badged as XC70 3.2
- –2014 Volvo XC60 badged as XC60 3.2

=== B6324S5 ===
The B6324S5 has a power output of 243 PS (179 kW; 240 hp) at 5600 rpm, and produces 320 N⋅m (236 lb⋅ft) of torque at 3200 rpm.
In its PZEV version power output is reduced to 234 PS (172 kW; 231 hp) and produces 300 N⋅m (220 lb⋅ft) of torque.

Model	Power	Torque
3.2	245 PS (180 kW; 242 hp)	320 N⋅m (236 lb⋅ft)
3.2 PZEV	234 PS (172 kW; 231 hp)	300 N⋅m (221 lb⋅ft)

Applications:

- 2011–2014 Volvo XC90 badged as XC90 3.2
- 2011–2014 Volvo S80 II badged as S80 3.2
- 2011–2014 Volvo V70 III badged as V70 3.2
- 2011–2015 Volvo XC70 II badged as XC70 3.2
- 2011–2014 Volvo XC60 badged as XC60 3.2

Applications:

- 2006–2012 Land Rover Freelander 2

== See also ==
- List of Ford engines
- List of Volvo engines
