= Volvo V60 =

Swedish compact executive station wagon

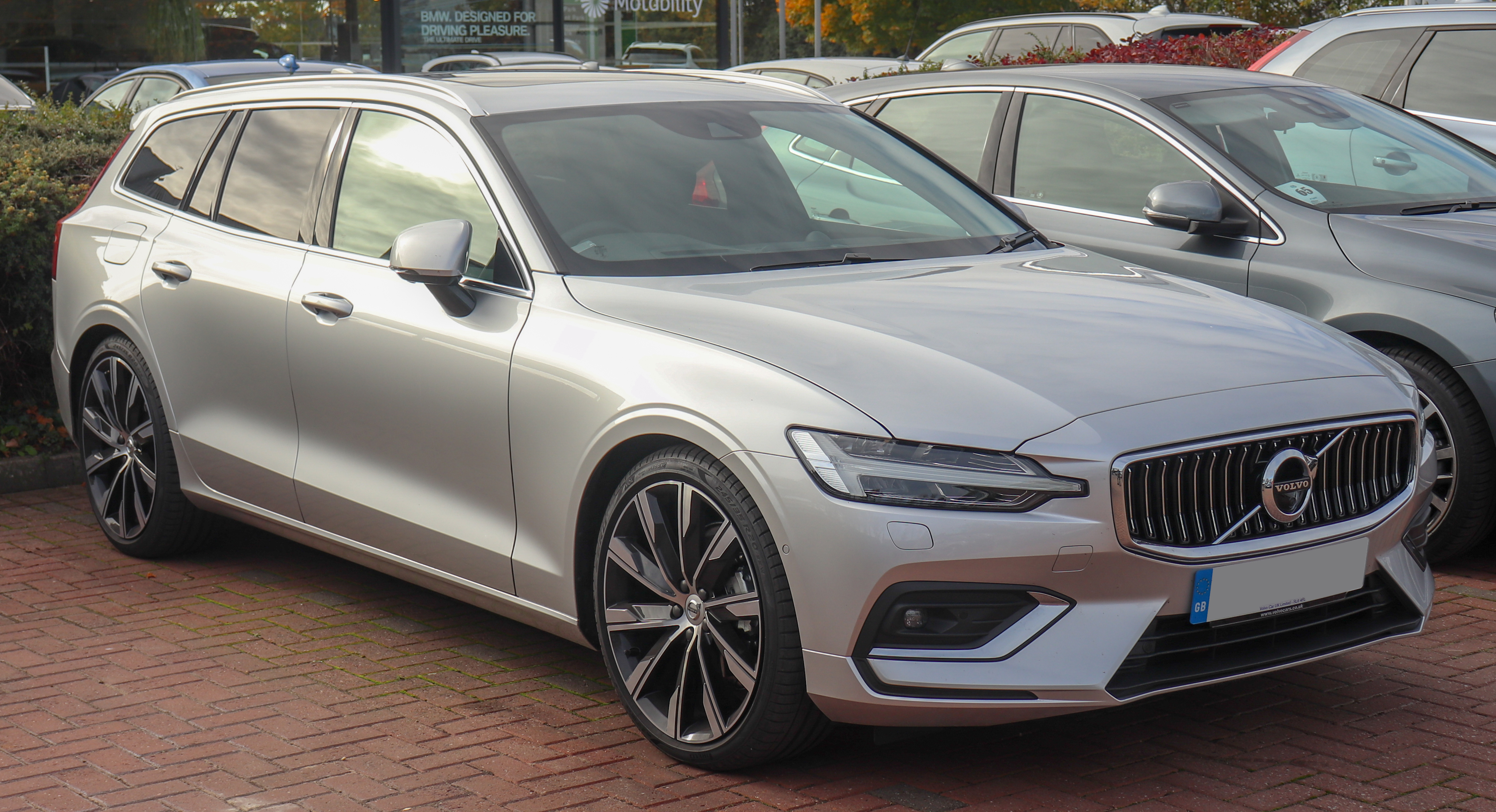
- 2018 Volvo V60

Overview
- Manufacturer: Volvo Cars
- Production: 2010–present

Body and chassis
- Class: Compact executive car (D)
- Body style: 5-door estate
- Related: Volvo S60 (sedan); Volvo XC60 (crossover)

Chronology
- Predecessor: Volvo V70; Volvo V50

The Volvo V60 is a compact executive station wagon (estate car) produced by Volvo Cars related to the S60 mid-size sedan. The vehicle was first released in autumn 2010, facelifted in 2014, and is in its second generation since 2018.

The second generation V60 was launched in 2018 based on the Volvo Scalable Product Architecture platform. Both generations feature a "Cross Country" variant with a slightly increased (60-mm / 2.4-inch) ground clearance and ride height.

== First generation (2010) ==
First generation
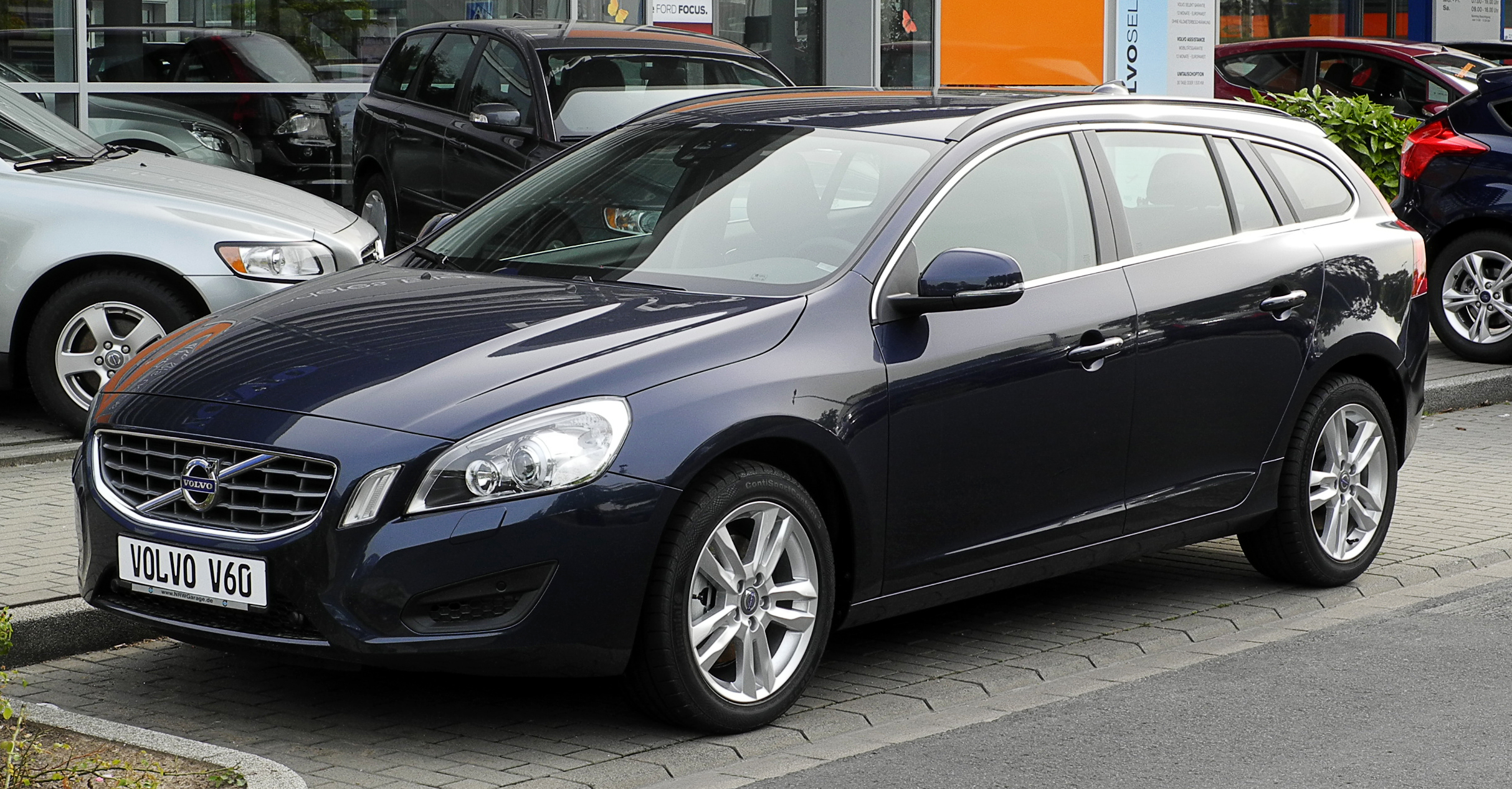
- Pre-facelift

Overview
- Manufacturer: Volvo Cars
- Production: 2010–2018
- Model years: 2011–2018
- Assembly: Sweden: Torslanda (Torslandaverken); Belgium: Ghent (Volvo Car Gent); Malaysia: Shah Alam (SMA)
- Designer: Örjan Sterner

Body and chassis
- Layout: Front engine; front-wheel drive or four-wheel drive
- Platform: Volvo P3 platform
- Related: Volvo S60 II

Powertrain
- Engine: petrol: 1.5–2.0 L I4; 2.0–2.5 L I5; 3.0 L I6; diesel: 1.6–2.0 L I4; 2.0–2.4 L I5; Diesel-Hybrid: 2.4 L I5
- Electric motor: 70 PS (51 kW; 69 hp) Permanent Magnet Synchronous Motors (D5/D6 Twin Engine)
- Transmission: 6-speed Volvo M66 manual; 6-speed Ford MMT6 manual; 6-speed Aisin TF-80SC automatic; 8-speed Aisin TG-81SC automatic
- Hybrid drivetrain: PHEV (D5/D6 Twin Engine)
- Battery: 11.2 kWh Lithium-ion (D5/D6 Twin Engine)

Dimensions
- Wheelbase: 2,776 mm (109.3 in)
- Length: 4,635 mm (182.5 in)
- Width: 1,865 mm (73.4 in); 2,097 mm (82.6 in) with mirrors
- Height: 1,484 mm (58.4 in); CC: 1,545 mm (60.8 in)
- Curb weight: 1,623–1,834 kg (3,578–4,043 lb); Plug-in Hybrid: 2,043–2,058 kg (4,504–4,537 lb)

=== V60 ===
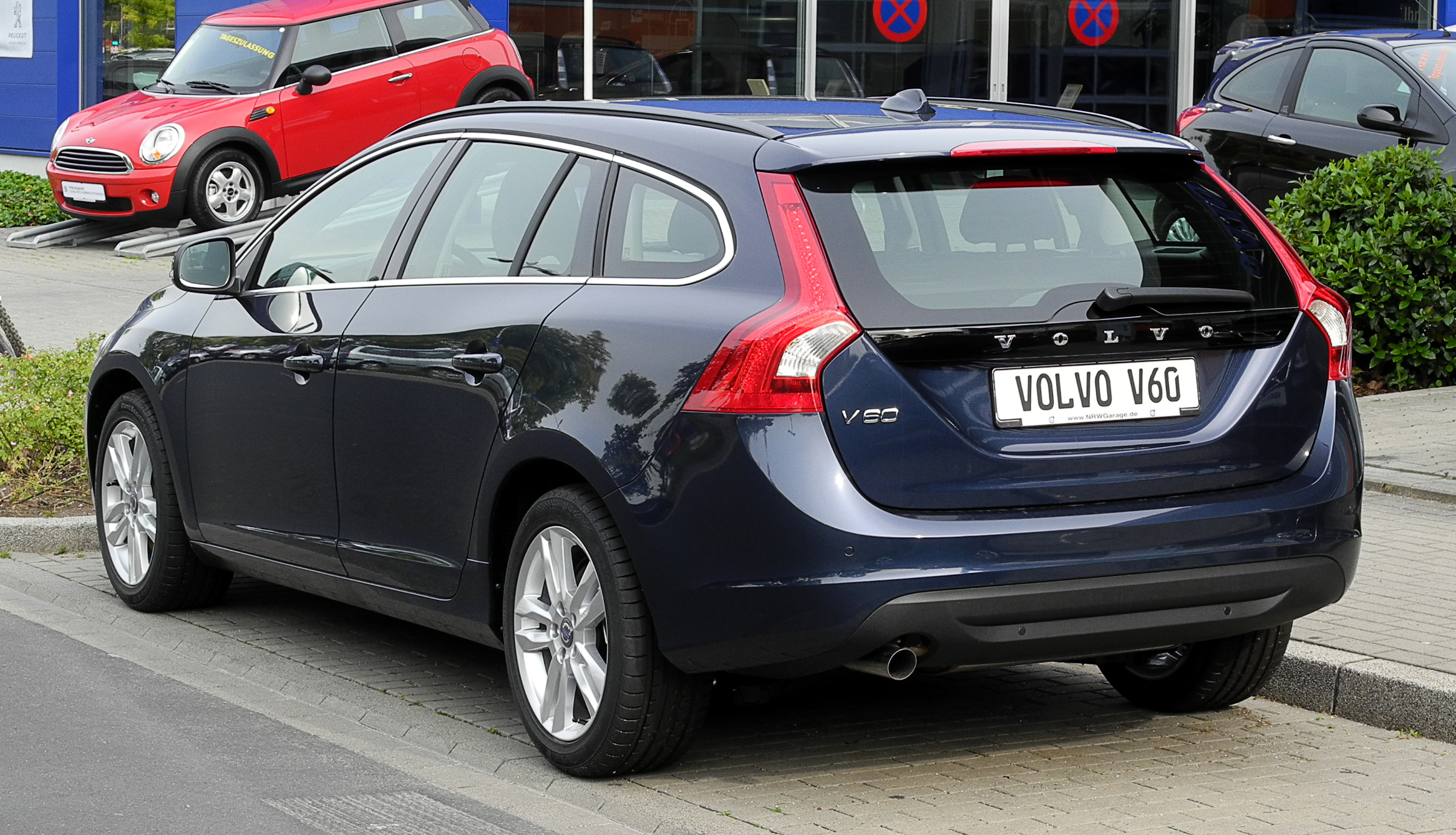
Volvo V60 pre-facelift (Germany)

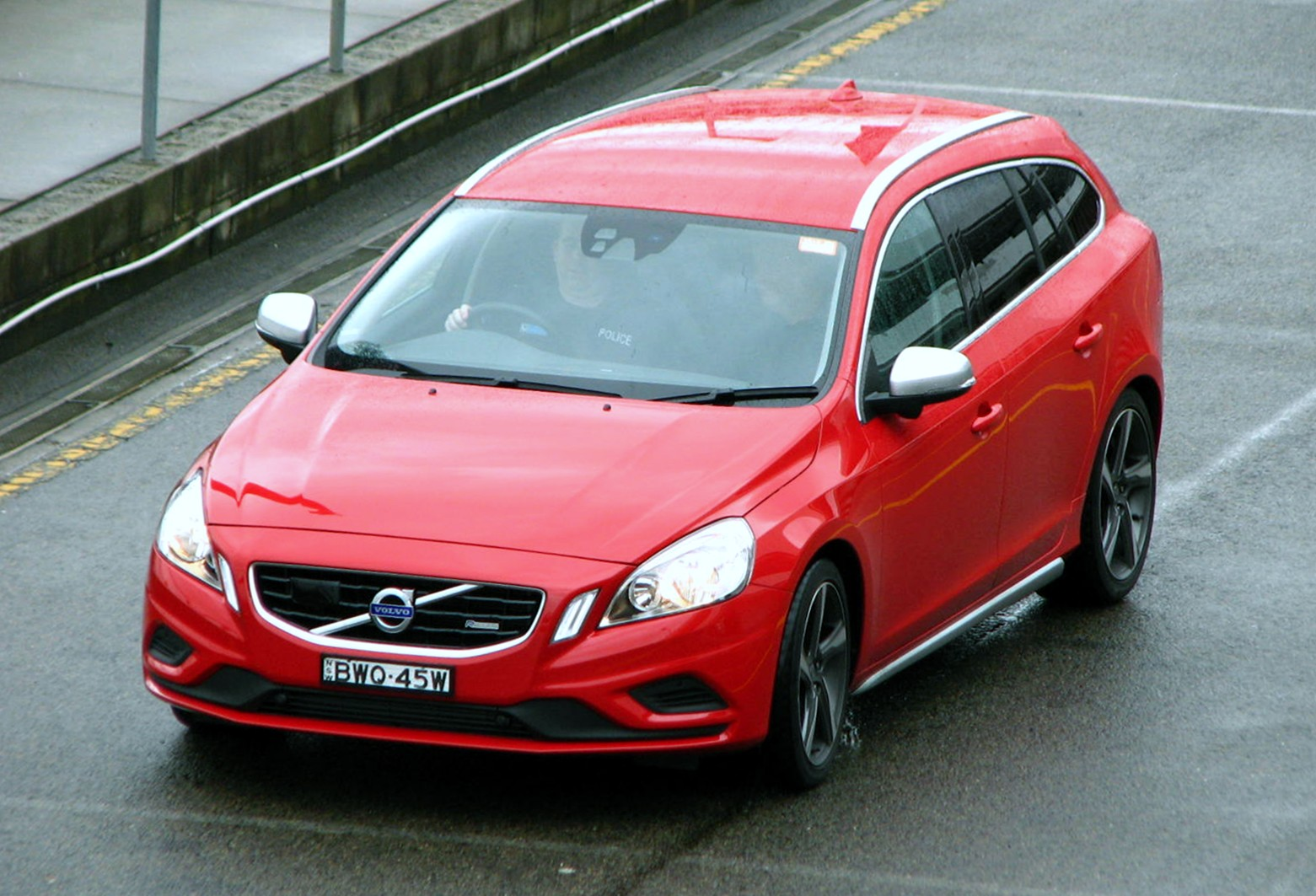
Volvo V60 R-Design pre-facelift (Australia)

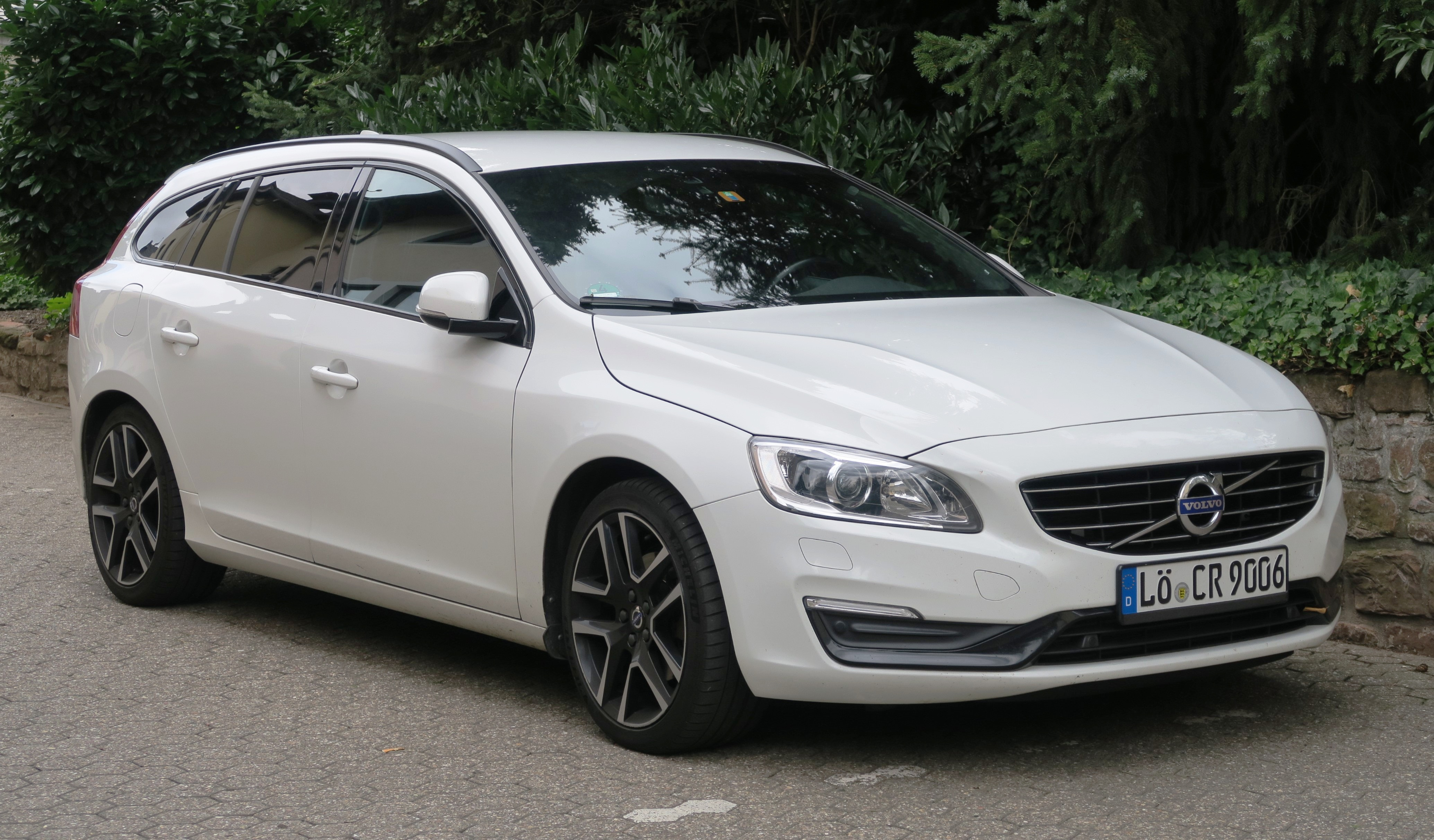
Volvo V60 post facelift (Germany)

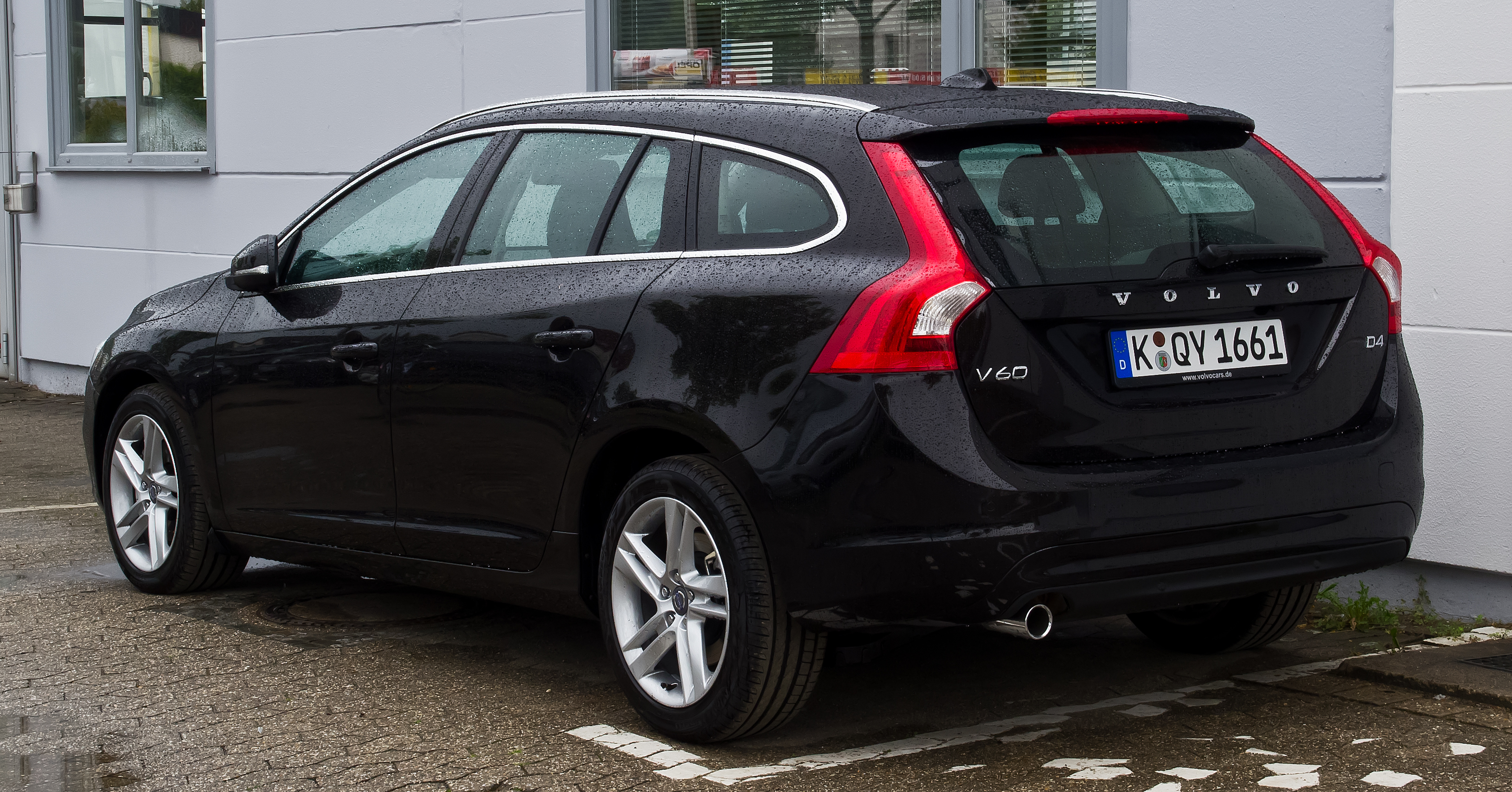
Volvo V60 post facelift (Germany)

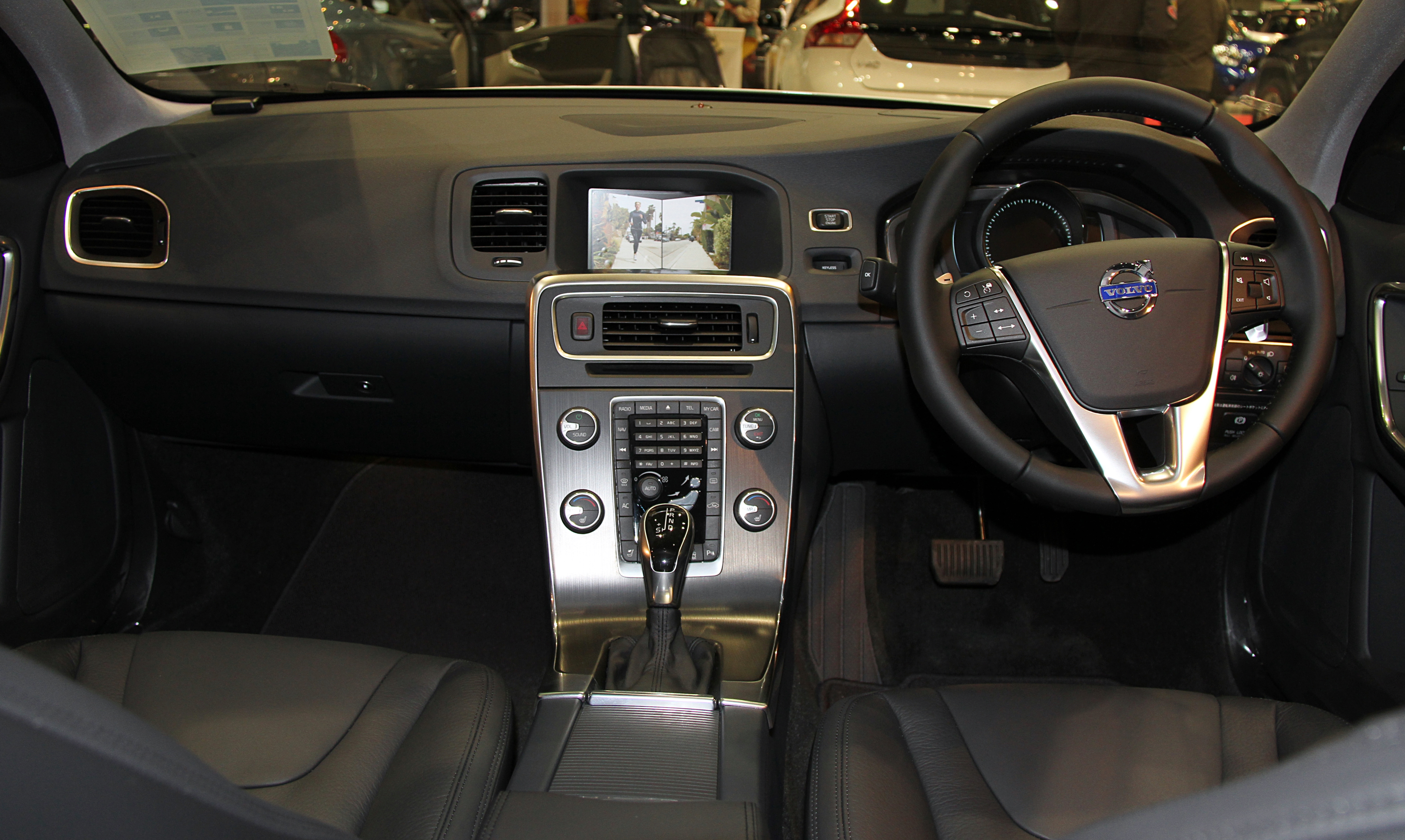
Interior

=== V60 Ocean Race ===
In February 2014, Volvo unveiled a special version of the V60 called Ocean Race Edition. Similar to other Ocean Race Editions that were released in the past, the new models feature unique details such as special alloy wheels and a cargo cover with the route of the 2014 to 2015 Volvo Ocean Race on it. Colour choice was limited to just four colours, one of them being the signature Ocean Race Blue. The interior features special Ocean Race themed detailing and contrast stitching.

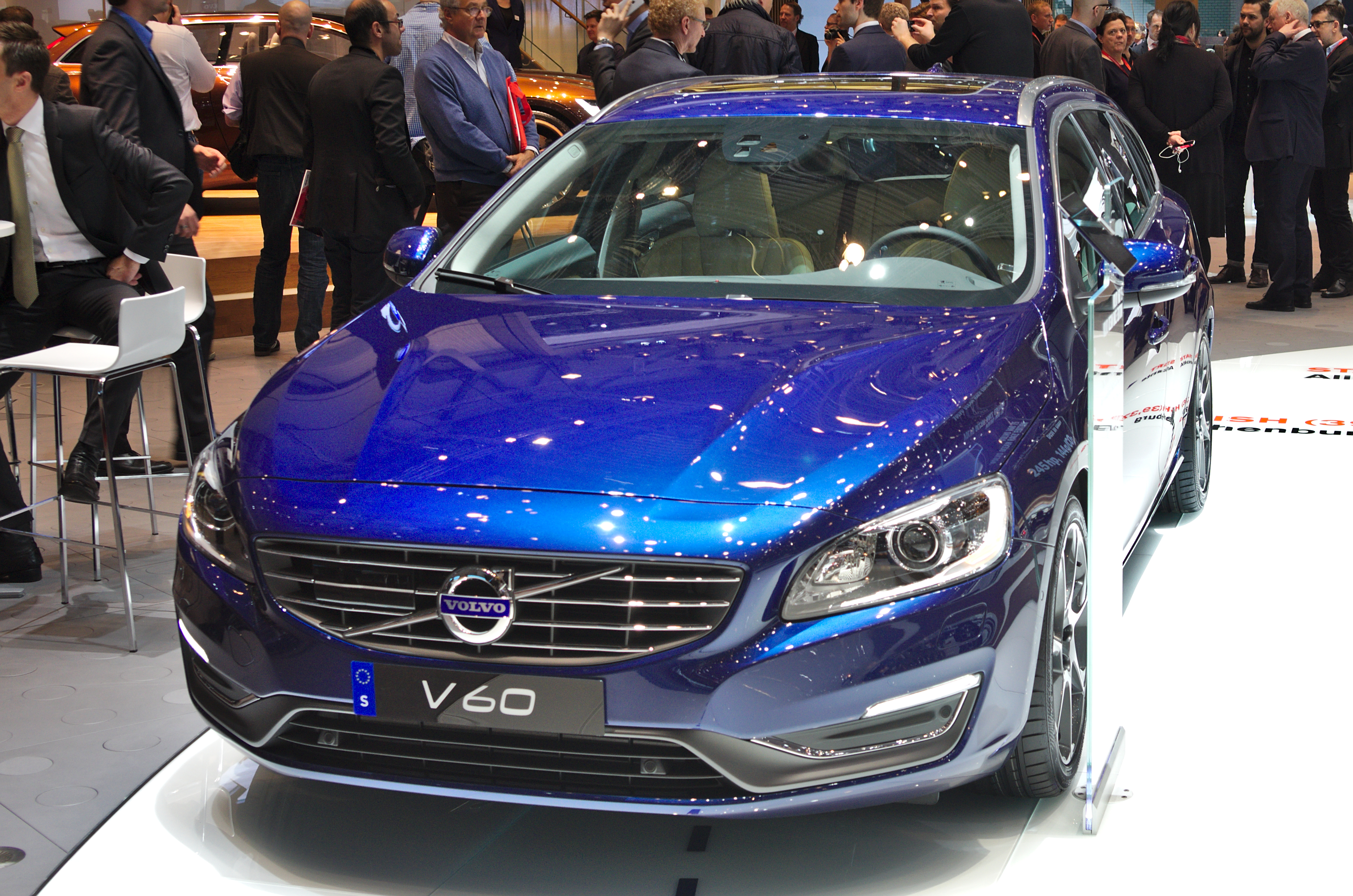
Volvo V60 Ocean Race (FR)

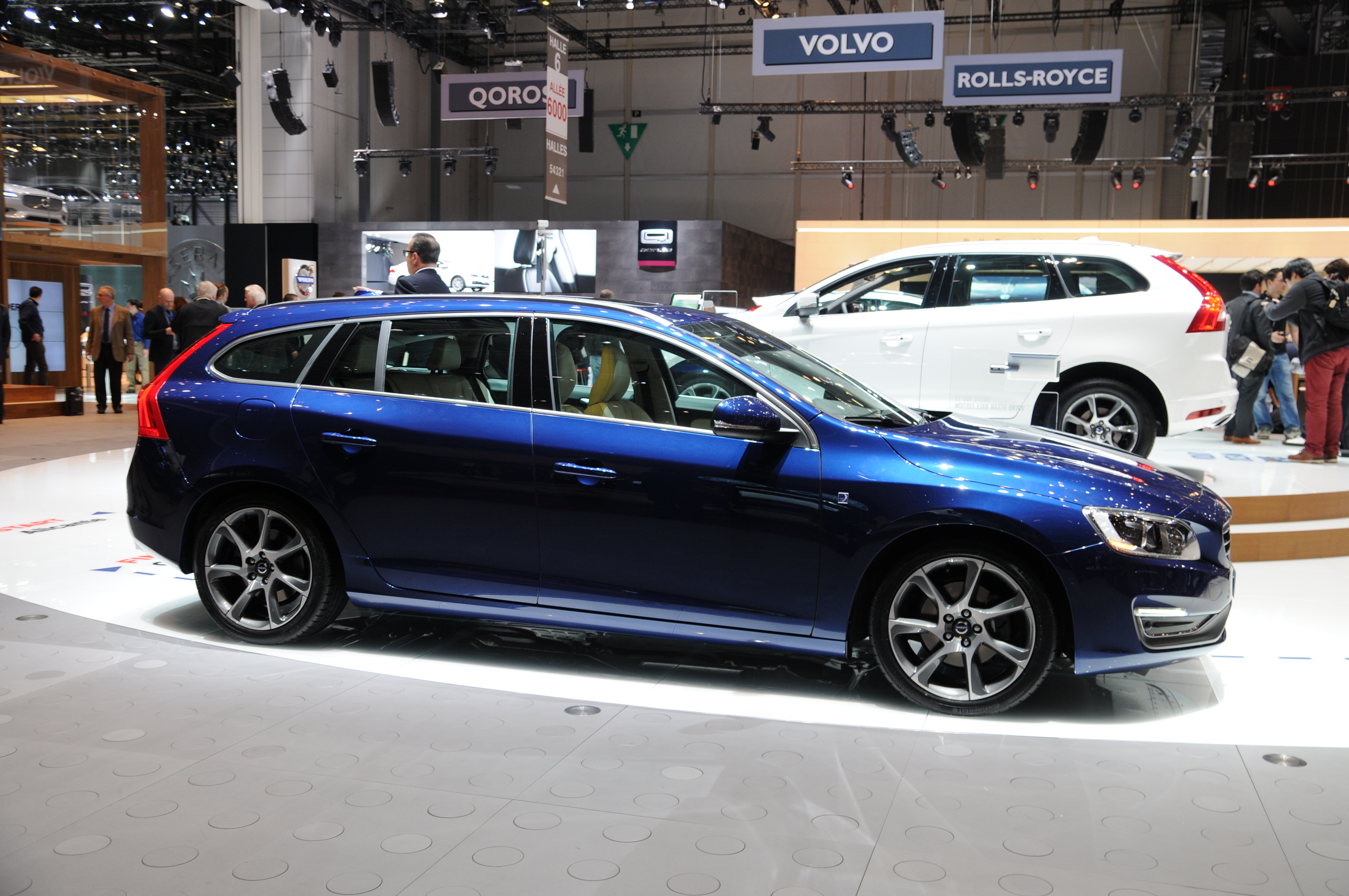
Volvo V60 Ocean Race (CH)

=== V60 Polestar ===
In 2013 Volvo unveiled a special, limited version of the V60 called V60 Polestar. It is a reworked V60 that was developed by Polestar and went on sale in 2014 in limited markets only. Apart from a retuned engine delivering 350PS the car received a wide range of suspension upgrades which included special dampers made by Öhlins, six piston brakes by Brembo and new swaybars.

Cosmetic changes include custom 20" alloy wheels, a different front and rear splitter and contrasting coloured interior stitching. When first introduced the only available paint colours were black metallic or "Rebel Blue", later white and silver metallic colours were added.

In 2016, the 2017 model year V60 Polestar received an all new four-cylinder, 2.0-litre turbo engine replacing the old 3.0-litre six-cylinder.

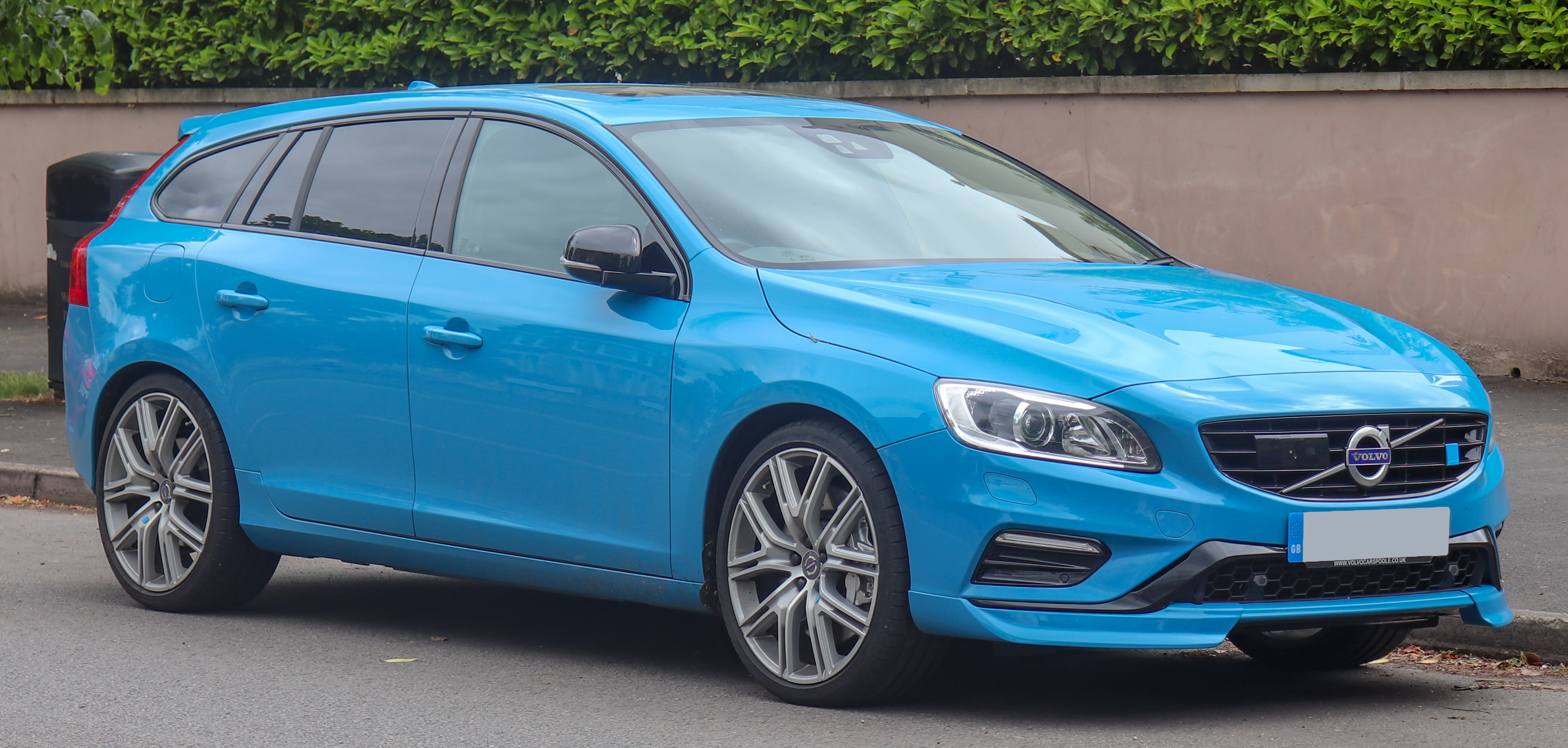
Volvo V60 Polestar (GB)

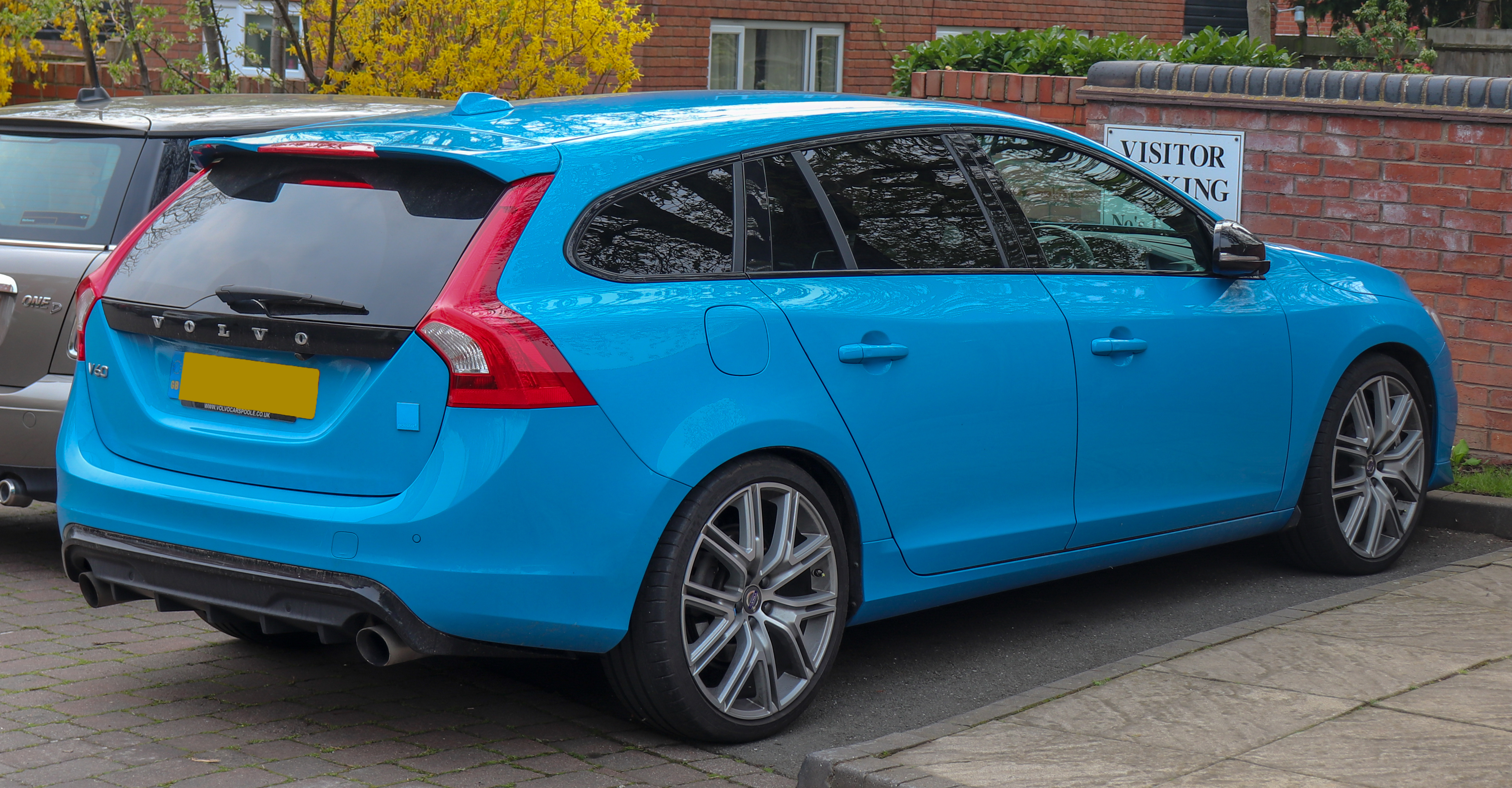
Rear

=== V60 Plug-in Hybrid ===
A pre-production version of the Volvo V60 diesel-electric transmission plug-in hybrid was unveiled at the Geneva Motor Show in March 2011. The V60 plug in is the result of close cooperation between Volvo Cars and Swedish energy supplier Vattenfall. The V60 plug-in has a price of around €50,000 (£40,000, US$64,600).

In September 2012, Volvo announced that the first 1,000 units were sold out before the model year 2013 vehicles were delivered to the dealerships. The carmaker ramped up production of the 2014 model year to 5,000 units for 2013. The first 1,000 units of the Volvo V60 Plug-in Hybrid were part of a "Pure Limited" edition with electric silver livery. The diesel electric car also has aero designed 17 inch wheels, integrated exhaust tailpipes and a number of bodywork features in glossy black.

The V60 Plug in Hybrid features a six speed automatic transmission and the front wheels are driven by a five-cylinder, 2.4-litre D5 turbo diesel, which produces 215 hp and maximum torque of 440 Nm. The rear axle features ERAD (Electric Rear Axle Drive) in the form of an electric motor producing 70 hp and maximum torque of 200 Nm, powered from a 12 kWh lithium-ion battery pack.

Volvo expects to achieve an all-electric range of up to 50 km (31 mi), and a fuel economy of 124 miles per gallon of gasoline equivalent (1.8 L/100 km), with carbon dioxide emissions averaging 49 g/km. The interaction between diesel and electric power is handled via a control system, and the driver has the option to choose the preferred driving mode via three buttons on the instrument panel: Pure, Hybrid and Power.

- In Pure Mode, the car runs only on its electric motor as much as possible. The driving range is up to 50 km (31 mi). Battery range varies with terrain, climate and driving style.
- Hybrid Mode is the default mode whenever the car is started. The diesel engine and electric motor interact to provide a balance between driving pleasure and low environmental impact. Emissions of CO_{2} are 49 g/km (EU Combined), corresponding to diesel fuel consumption of 1.8 L/100 km. The car's total range is up to 1,200 kilometres (750 mi).
- In Power Mode, the hybrid system is optimised to give the car the best possible performance. The electric motor's quick torque delivery contributes to the car's 0 to 100 km/h acceleration time of 6.1 seconds.

In April 2014, Volvo announced the addition of an R Design version of its V60 Plug in Hybrid, which features a number of unique interior and exterior features that create a sporty look.

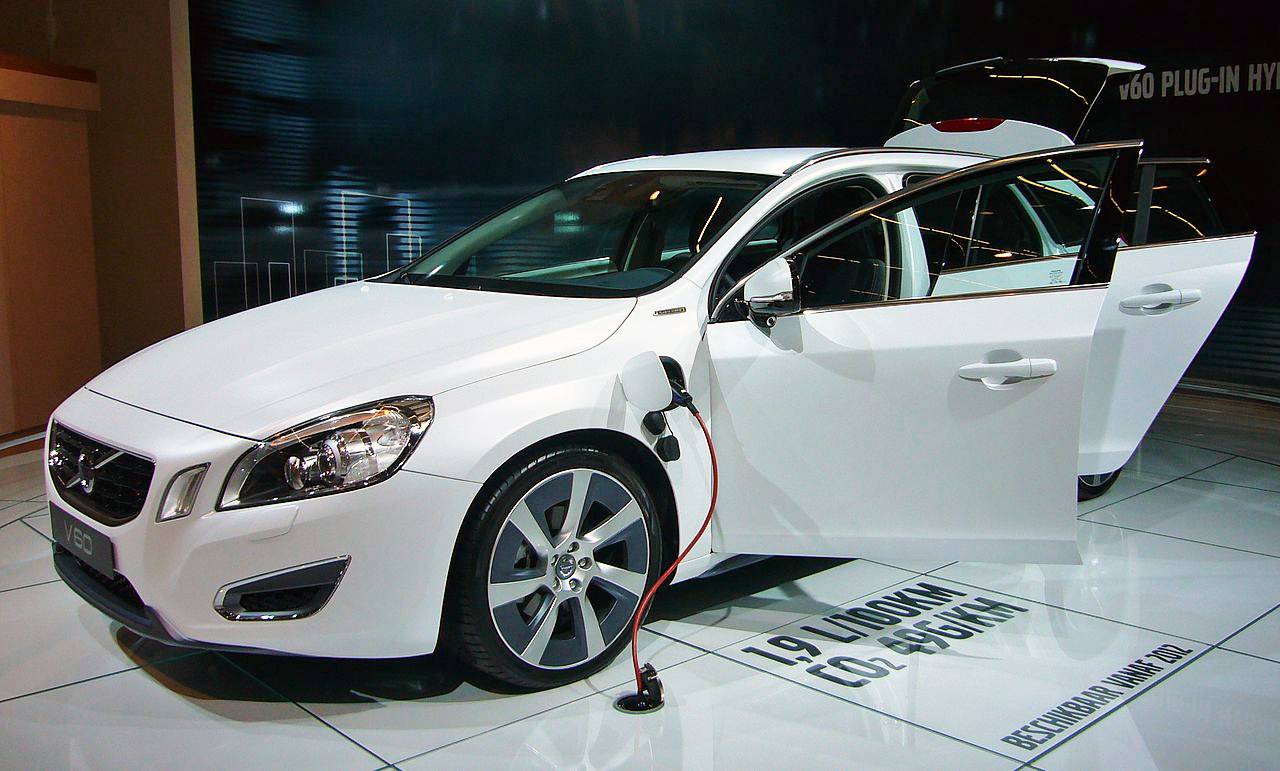
Volvo V60 Plug-in Hybrid pre facelift (NL)

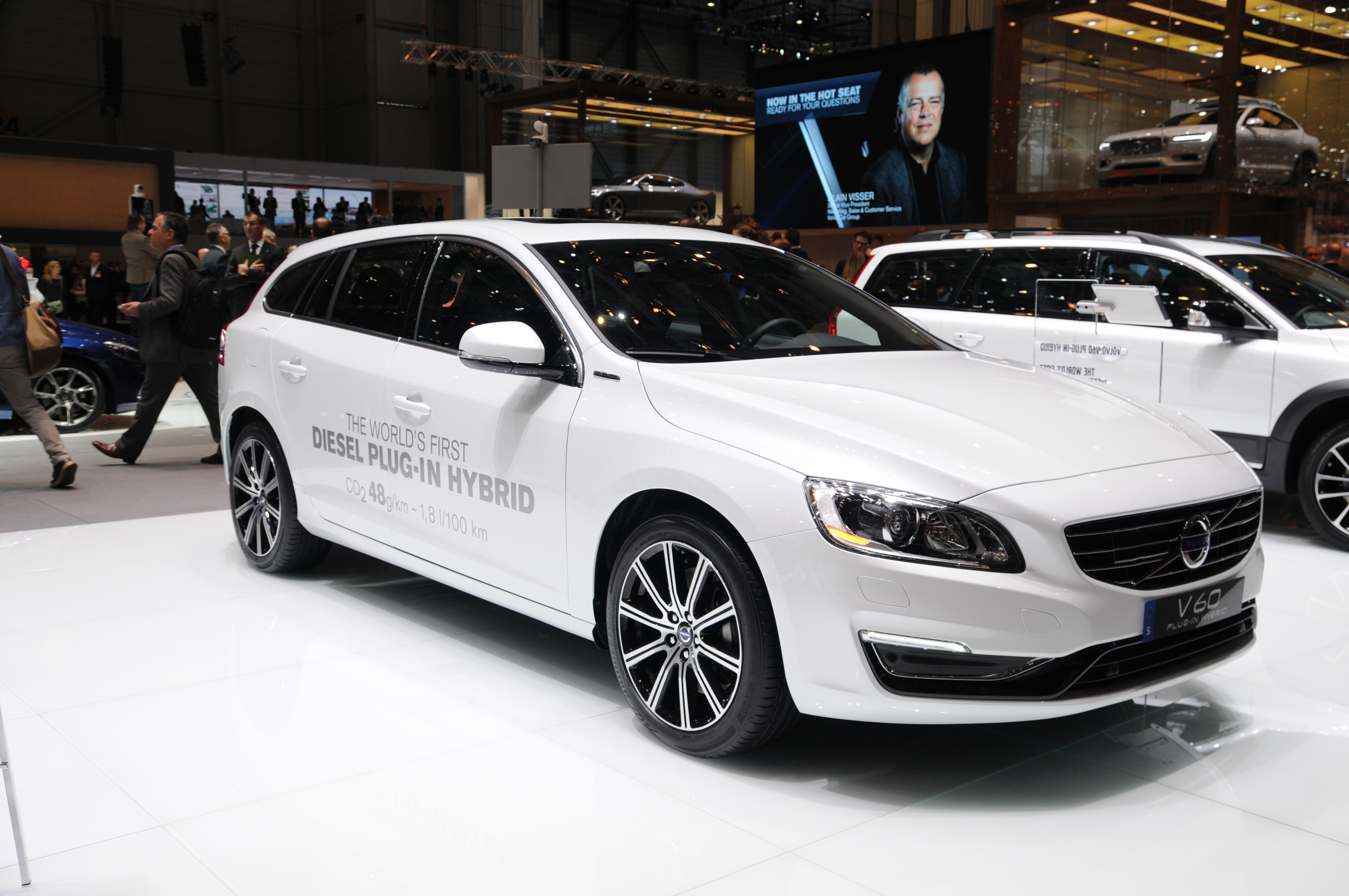
Volvo V60 Plug in Hybrid post facelift (CH)

==== Markets and sales ====
Deliveries began in Sweden in the end of 2012, and in the United Kingdom began in June 2013. As of December 2014, sales were led by the Netherlands with 9,707 units registered, followed by Sweden with 1,388 units delivered. The Volvo V60 PHEV ranked as the second best selling plug in hybrid in Europe in 2013 and 2014, both times after the Mitsubishi Outlander P-HEV, and fell to fifth place in 2015. A total of 19,571 units have sold in Europe through December 2015.

==== Recognition ====
The Volvo V60 Plug-in Hybrid was one of the top three finalists for the 2013 World Green Car of the Year. The car won Car of The Year at the 2011 Middle East Motor Awards.

=== V60 Cross Country ===
The V60 Cross Country is the raised variant of the Volvo V60 first introduced in 2015. It is sold in both North American and European markets, and comes standard with all-wheel drive in North America.

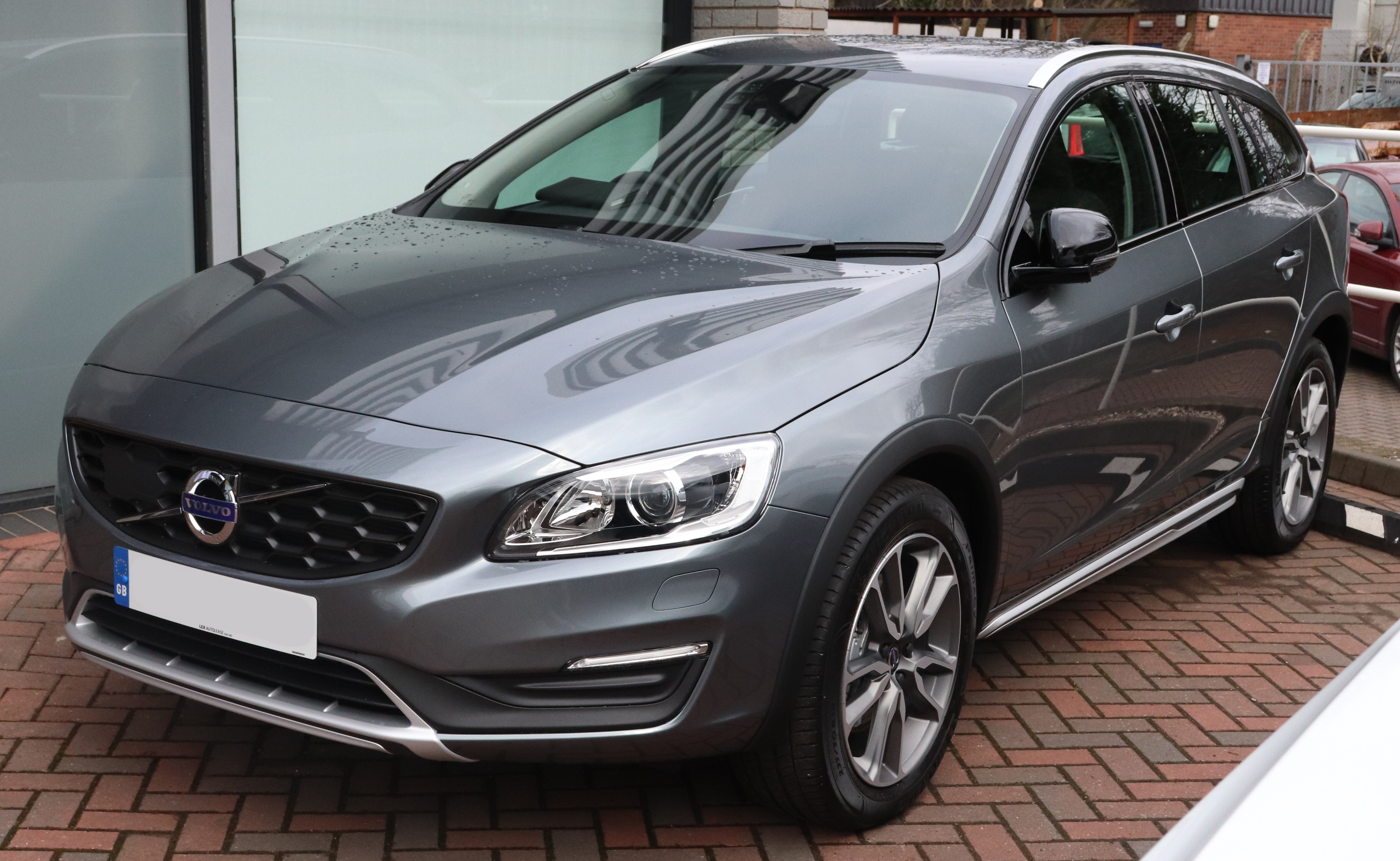
Volvo V60 Cross Country (EU)

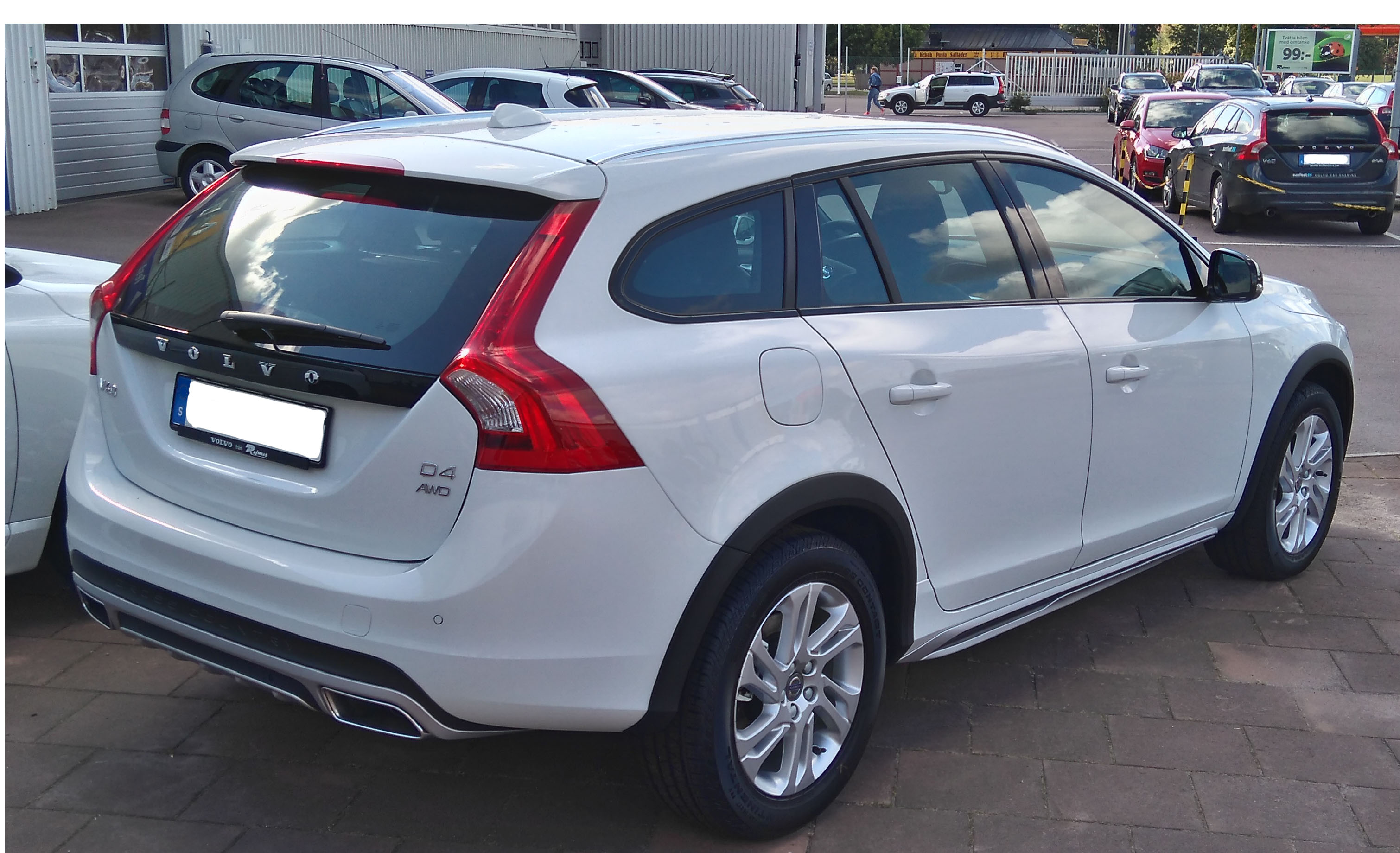
Volvo V60 Cross Country (EU)

=== Safety ===
ANCAP test results* Volvo V60 (2011)
Test	Score
Overall	5 /5 stars
Frontal offset	15.34/16
Side impact	16/16
Pole	2/2
Seat belt reminders	3/3
Whiplash protection	Good
Pedestrian protection	Adequate
Electronic stability control	Standard

=== Engines ===
Petrol engines
Model	Engine code	Year(s)	Power at rpm	Torque at rpm	Displacement	Comment
2.0T	B4204T6	2011	203 PS (149 kW; 200 hp) at 6000	300 N⋅m (221 lb⋅ft) at 1750–4000	1,999 cc (122.0 cu in)	I4 turbo
T3	B4164T3	2011–2015	150 PS (110 kW; 148 hp) at 5700	240 N⋅m (177 lb⋅ft) at 1600–4000	1,595 cc (97.3 cu in)	I4 turbo
T3	B4154T4	2016–2018	152 PS (112 kW; 150 hp) at 5000	250 N⋅m (184 lb⋅ft) at 1700–4000	1,498 cc (91.4 cu in)	I4 turbo VEA
T3	B4204T37	2016–2018	152 PS (112 kW; 150 hp) at 5000	250 N⋅m (184 lb⋅ft) at 1300–4000	1,969 cc (120.2 cu in)	I4 turbo VEA
T4	B4164T	2011–2015	180 PS (132 kW; 178 hp) at 5700	240 N⋅m (177 lb⋅ft) at 1600–5000	1,595 cc (97.3 cu in)	I4 turbo
T4F	B4164T2	2012–2015	180 PS (132 kW; 178 hp) at 5700	240 N⋅m (177 lb⋅ft) at 1600–5000	1,596 cc (97.4 cu in)	I4 turbo
T4	B4204T19	2015–2018	190 PS (140 kW; 187 hp) at 4700	300 N⋅m (221 lb⋅ft) at 1300–4000	1,969 cc (120.2 cu in)	I4 turbo VEA
T5 (Note: Selected markets only)	B5254T12	2013–2018	254 PS (187 kW; 251 hp) at 5400	360 N⋅m (266 lb⋅ft) at 1800–4200	2,497 cc (152.4 cu in)	I5 turbo
T5	B4204T7	2011–2013	240 PS (177 kW; 237 hp) at 5500	320 N⋅m (236 lb⋅ft) at 1800–5000	1,999 cc (122.0 cu in)	I4 turbo
T5	B5204T9	2012-2015	213 PS (157 kW; 210 hp) at 6000	300 N⋅m (221 lb⋅ft) at 2700–5000 rpm	1,984 cc (122.0 cu in)	
T5	B4204T9	2013–2018	302 PS (222 kW; 298 hp) at 5700	400 N⋅m (295 lb⋅ft) at 2100–4500	1,969 cc (120.2 cu in)	I4 turbo VEA
T5; T5 BiFuel	B4204T11	2014–2018	245 PS (180 kW; 242 hp) at 5500	350 N⋅m (258 lb⋅ft) at 1500–4800	1,969 cc (120.2 cu in)	I4 turbo VEA
T5	B4204T15	2014–2018	220 PS (162 kW; 217 hp) at 5500	350 N⋅m (258 lb⋅ft) at 1500–4000	1,969 cc (120.2 cu in)	I4 turbo VEA
T5	B4204T41	2014–2018	245 PS (180 kW; 242 hp) at 5500	350 N⋅m (258 lb⋅ft) at 1500–4800	1,969 cc (120.2 cu in)	I4 turbo VEA
T6; T6 AWD	B4204T9	2014–2018	306 PS (225 kW; 302 hp) at 5700	400 N⋅m (295 lb⋅ft) at 2100–4800	1,969 cc (120.2 cu in)	I4 turbo VEA
T6 AWD	B6304T4	2011–2016	304 PS (224 kW; 300 hp) at 5700	440 N⋅m (325 lb⋅ft) at 2100–4800	2,953 cc (180.2 cu in)	I6 turbo SI6
Polestar	B6304T5	2015–2016	350 PS (257 kW; 345 hp) at 5250	500 N⋅m (369 lb⋅ft) at 3000–4750	2,953 cc (180.2 cu in)	I6 turbo SI6
Polestar	B4204T43	2016–2018	367 PS (270 kW; 362 hp) at 6000	470 N⋅m (347 lb⋅ft) at 3100–5100	1,969 cc (120.2 cu in)	I4 turbo VEA

Diesel engines
Model	Engine code	Year(s)	Power at rpm	Torque at rpm	Displacement	Comment
DRIVe	D4162T	2011–2012	115 PS (85 kW; 113 hp) at 3600	270 N⋅m (199 lb⋅ft) at 1750–2500	1,560 cc (95.2 cu in)	I4 turbo
D2	D4162T	2013–2015	115 PS (85 kW; 113 hp) at 3600	270 N⋅m (199 lb⋅ft) at 1750–2500	1,560 cc (95.2 cu in)	I4 turbo
D2	D4204T8	2016–2018	120 PS (88 kW; 118 hp) at 3750	280 N⋅m (207 lb⋅ft) at 1500–2300	1,969 cc (120.2 cu in)	I4 VEA
D2	D4204T20	2015-2018	120 PS (88 kW; 118 hp) at 3750	280 N⋅m (207 lb⋅ft) at 1500–2250	1,969 cc (120.2 cu in)	I4 VEA
D3	D5204T7	2013–2018	136 PS (100 kW; 134 hp) at 3500	350 N⋅m (258 lb⋅ft) at 1500–2250	1,984 cc (121.1 cu in)	I5 VD5
D3	D4204T9	2015–2018	150 PS (110 kW; 148 hp) at 3750	320 N⋅m (236 lb⋅ft) at 1750–3000	1,969 cc (120.2 cu in)	I4 VEA
D4	D5204T3	2012–2018	163 PS (120 kW; 161 hp) at 3500	400 N⋅m (295 lb⋅ft) at 1500–2750	1,984 cc (121.1 cu in)	I5 VD5
D4	D4204T5	2014–2015	181 PS (133 kW; 179 hp) at 4250	400 N⋅m (295 lb⋅ft) at 1750–2500	1,969 cc (120.2 cu in)	I4 VEA
D4	D4204T14	2016–2018	190 PS (140 kW; 187 hp) at 4250	400 N⋅m (295 lb⋅ft) at 1750–2500	1,969 cc (120.2 cu in)	I4 VEA
D4 AWD	D5244T12	2014–2015	181 PS (133 kW; 179 hp) at 4000	420 N⋅m (310 lb⋅ft) at 1500–2500	2,400 cc (146.5 cu in)	I5 VD5
D4 AWD	D5244T17	2013–2015	163 PS (120 kW; 161 hp) at 4000	420 N⋅m (310 lb⋅ft) at 1500–2500	2,400 cc (146.5 cu in)	I5 VD5
D4 AWD	D5244T21	2015–2018	190 PS (140 kW; 187 hp) at 4000	420 N⋅m (310 lb⋅ft) at 1500–3000	2,400 cc (146.5 cu in)	I5 VD5
D5	D5244T10	2011–2012	205 PS (151 kW; 202 hp) at 4000	420 N⋅m (310 lb⋅ft) at 1500–3250	2,400 cc (146.5 cu in)	I5 VD5
D5	D5244T11	2012–2015	215 PS (158 kW; 212 hp) at 4000	420 N⋅m (310 lb⋅ft) at 1500–3250	2,400 cc (146.5 cu in)	I5 VD5
D5; D5 AWD	D5244T15	2012–2015	215 PS (158 kW; 212 hp) at 4000	440 N⋅m (325 lb⋅ft) at 1500–3000	2,400 cc (146.5 cu in)	I5 VD5

Diesel Plug-in Hybrid engines
Model	Engine code	Year(s)	Power at rpm	Torque at rpm	Displacement	Comment
D6 AWD	D82PHEV	2013–2014	215 PS (158 kW; 212 hp) at 4000; + 70 PS (51 kW; 69 hp) electric	440 N⋅m (325 lb⋅ft) at 1500–3000; + 200 N⋅m (148 lb⋅ft) electric	2,400 cc (146.5 cu in)	diesel; hybrid
D6 AWD	D97PHEV	2016–2018	220 PS (162 kW; 217 hp) at 4000; + 70 PS (51 kW; 69 hp) electric	440 N⋅m (325 lb⋅ft) at 1500–3000; + 200 N⋅m (148 lb⋅ft) electric	2,400 cc (146.5 cu in)	diesel; hybrid
D5 AWD	D87PHEV	2015–2018	163 PS (120 kW; 161 hp) at 4000; + 70 PS (51 kW; 69 hp) electric	420 N⋅m (310 lb⋅ft) at 1500–2500; + 200 N⋅m (148 lb⋅ft) electric	2,400 cc (146.5 cu in)	diesel; hybrid

== Second generation (2018) ==
Second generation
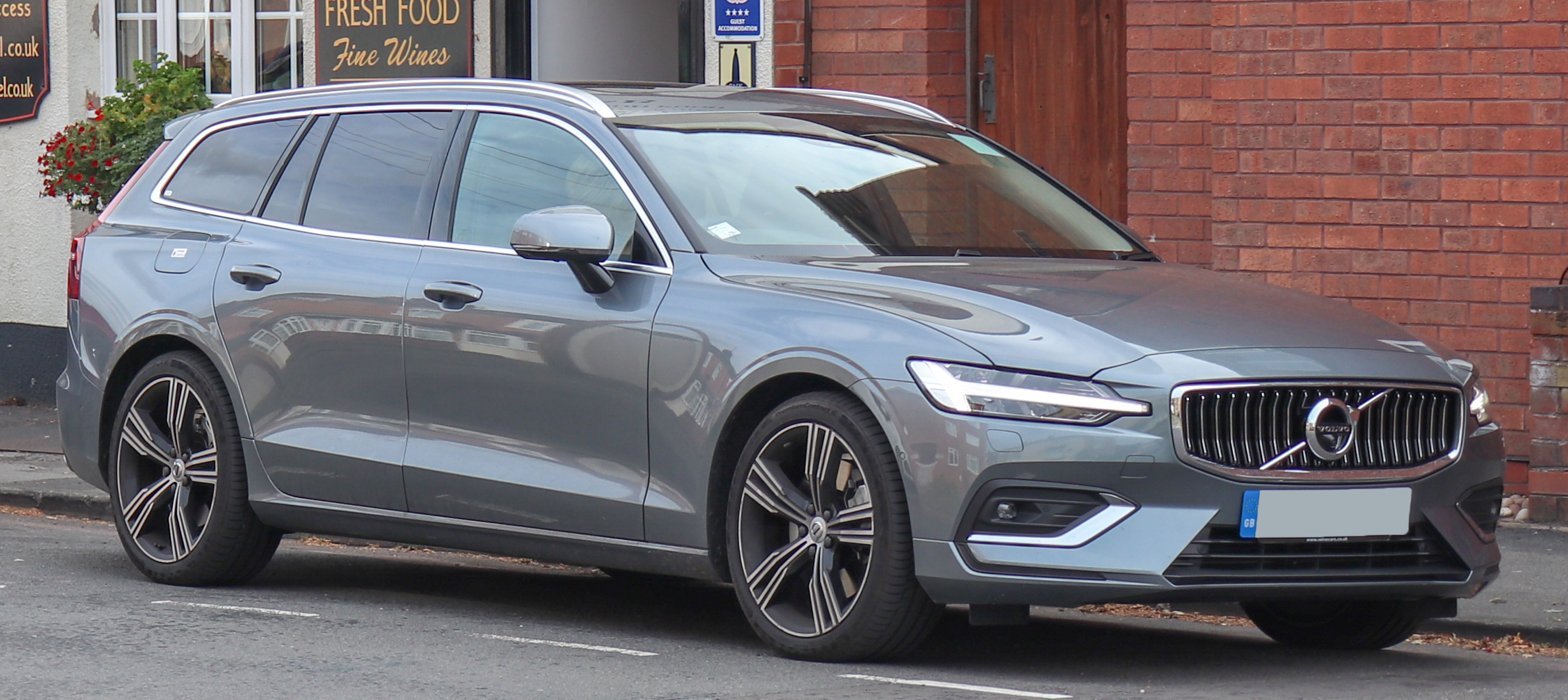
- 2018 Volvo V60 Inscription

Overview
- Manufacturer: Volvo Cars
- Production: February 2018–present
- Model years: 2019–present
- Assembly: Sweden: Torslanda (Torslandaverken); Belgium: Ghent (Volvo Car Gent); Malaysia: Shah Alam (VCMM)
- Designer: T. Jon Mayer, Maxime Prevoteaux

Body and chassis
- Layout: Front engine; front-wheel drive or four-wheel drive
- Platform: Volvo SPA Platform
- Related: Volvo S60 III

Powertrain
- Engine: Petrol: 2.0 L B4204T26/T29/T44 I4; Diesel: 2.0 L D4204T14/T16 I4; Hybrid: 2.0 L B4204T34/T35/T46 I4
- Electric motor: Permanent Magnet Synchronous Motors (T6/T8 Twin Engine)
- Transmission: 6-speed Volvo M76 R7.0 manual; 6-speed Volvo M66F automatic; 8-speed Aisin TG-81SC automatic; 8-speed Aisin TG-81SD automatic
- Hybrid drivetrain: PHEV (T6/T8 Twin Engine & T6/T8 Recharge); MHEV
- Battery: 11.2 kWh Lithium-ion (T6 /T8 Twin Engine) MY2019-2021; 19 kWh Lithium-ion (T6 /T8 Twin Engine) since MY2022

Dimensions
- Wheelbase: 2,872 mm (113.1 in)
- Length: 4,761 mm (187.4 in)
- Width: 1,850 mm (72.8 in); 2,040 mm (80.3 in) with mirrors
- Height: 1,427 mm (56.2 in)
- Curb weight: 1,690–2,090 kg (3,730–4,610 lb)

The second generation Volvo V60 is based on the Volvo SPA Platform, like the saloons Volvo S60, Volvo S90, and the SUVs Volvo XC60 and Volvo XC90. It went on sale in July 2018. The V60 is built in both Sweden and Belgium. In the U.S., since 2021, the V60 is only available as a Cross Country model with one gasoline powertrain, dubbed T5, though a Polestar Engineered enhancement is available as an option. Mild hybrid variants were added in 2022, and in 2023, replaced conventional gas engines in the US. In Europe, Volvo offers two gasoline engines, two diesel engines, and two plug-in hybrid powertrains to choose from. Over in Malaysia, the V60 facelift comes in a sole T8 Recharge Inscription variant, with a 2.0 litre turbocharged and supercharged four-cylinder engine with a rear-mounted electric motor. All of this results in AWD and a total power output of 407 PS (299 kW; 401 hp), 640 N⋅m (472 lb⋅ft) of torque and a claimed EV range of 49 kilometres (30 mi).

In the later released long range version, with a bigger 19kWh battery the range increased to over 90 km.

=== Second generation models ===
==== V60 ====
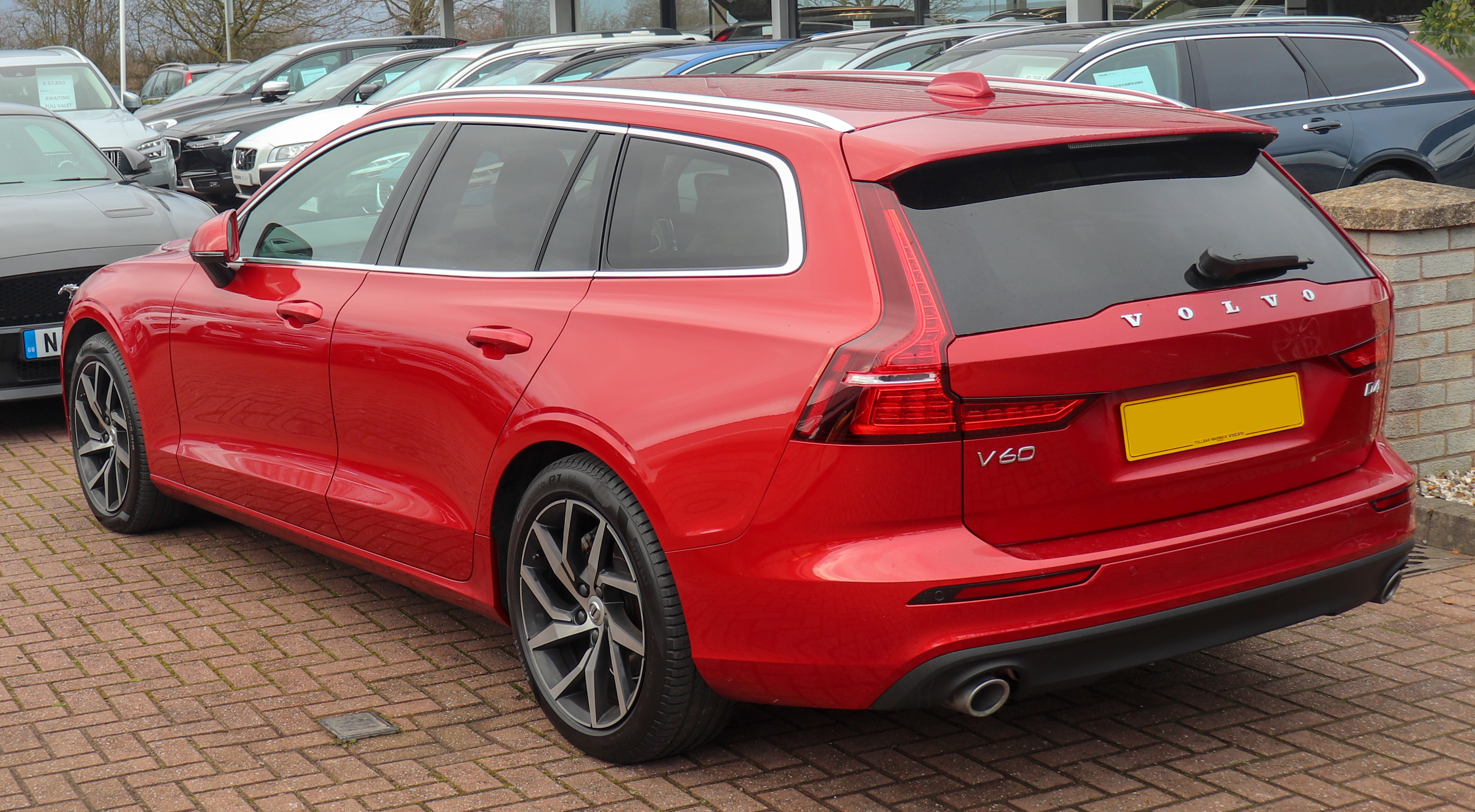
Volvo V60

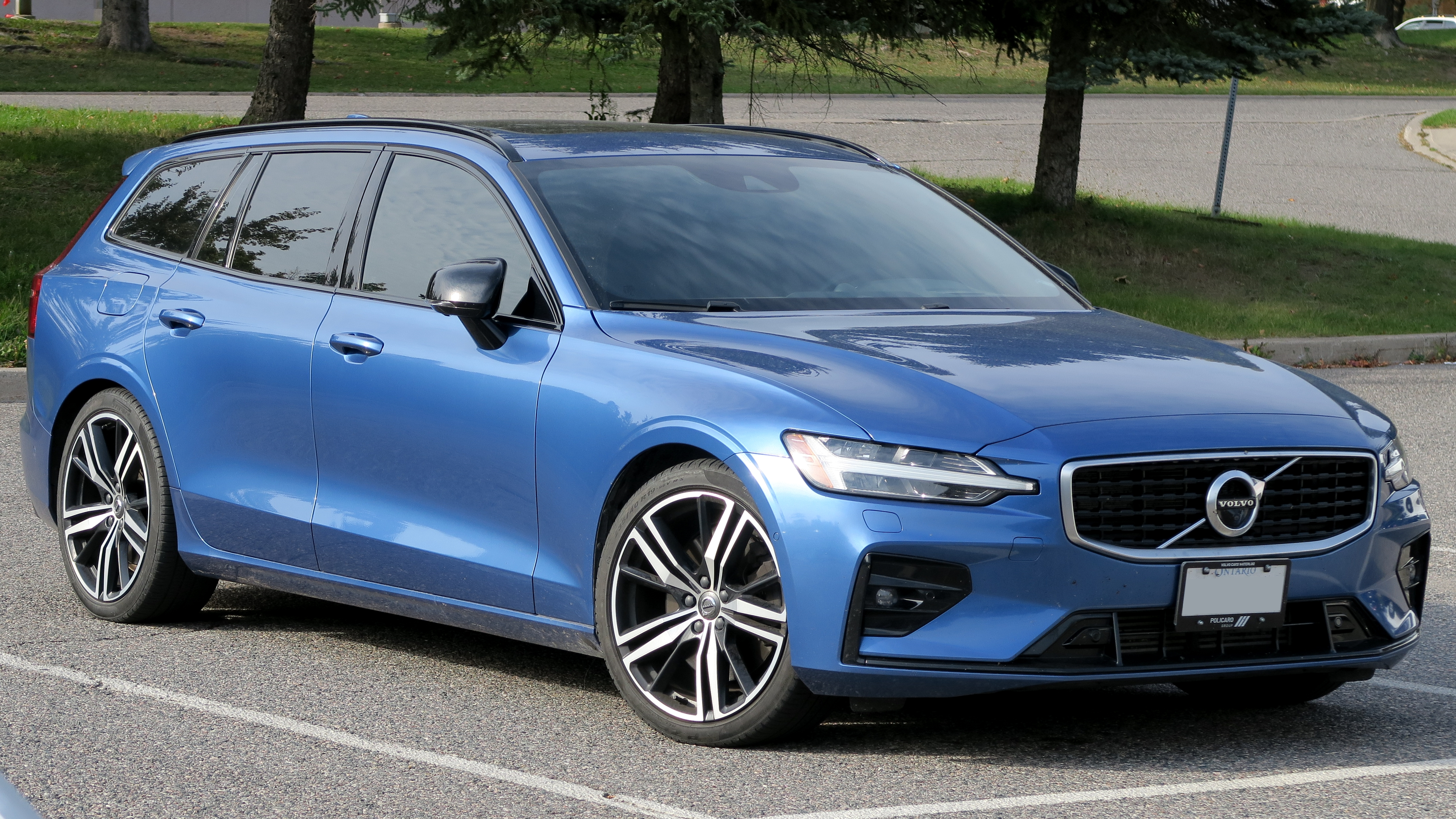
Volvo V60 R-Design

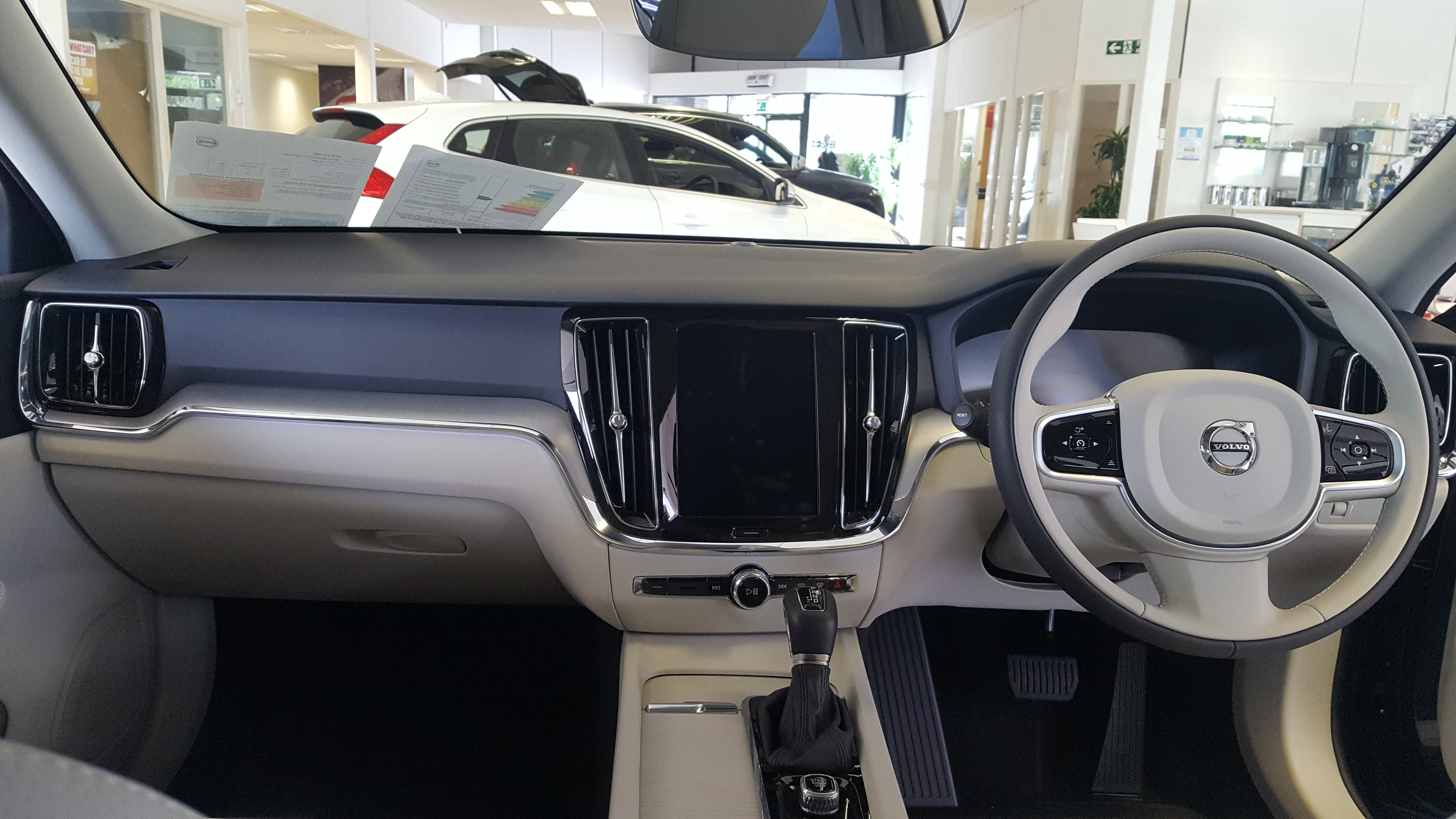
Interior

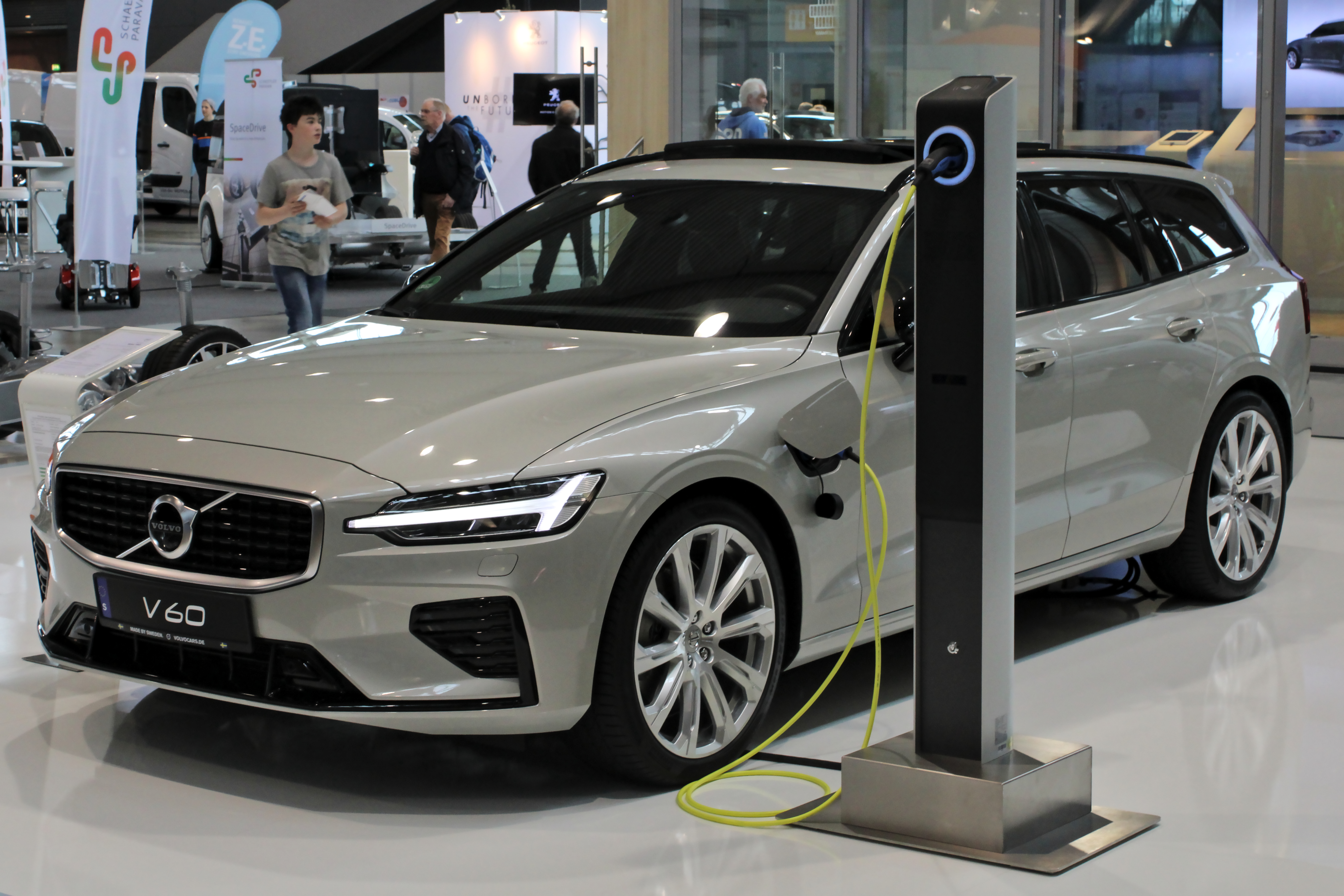
Volvo V60 T8 Twin Engine

==== V60 Cross Country ====
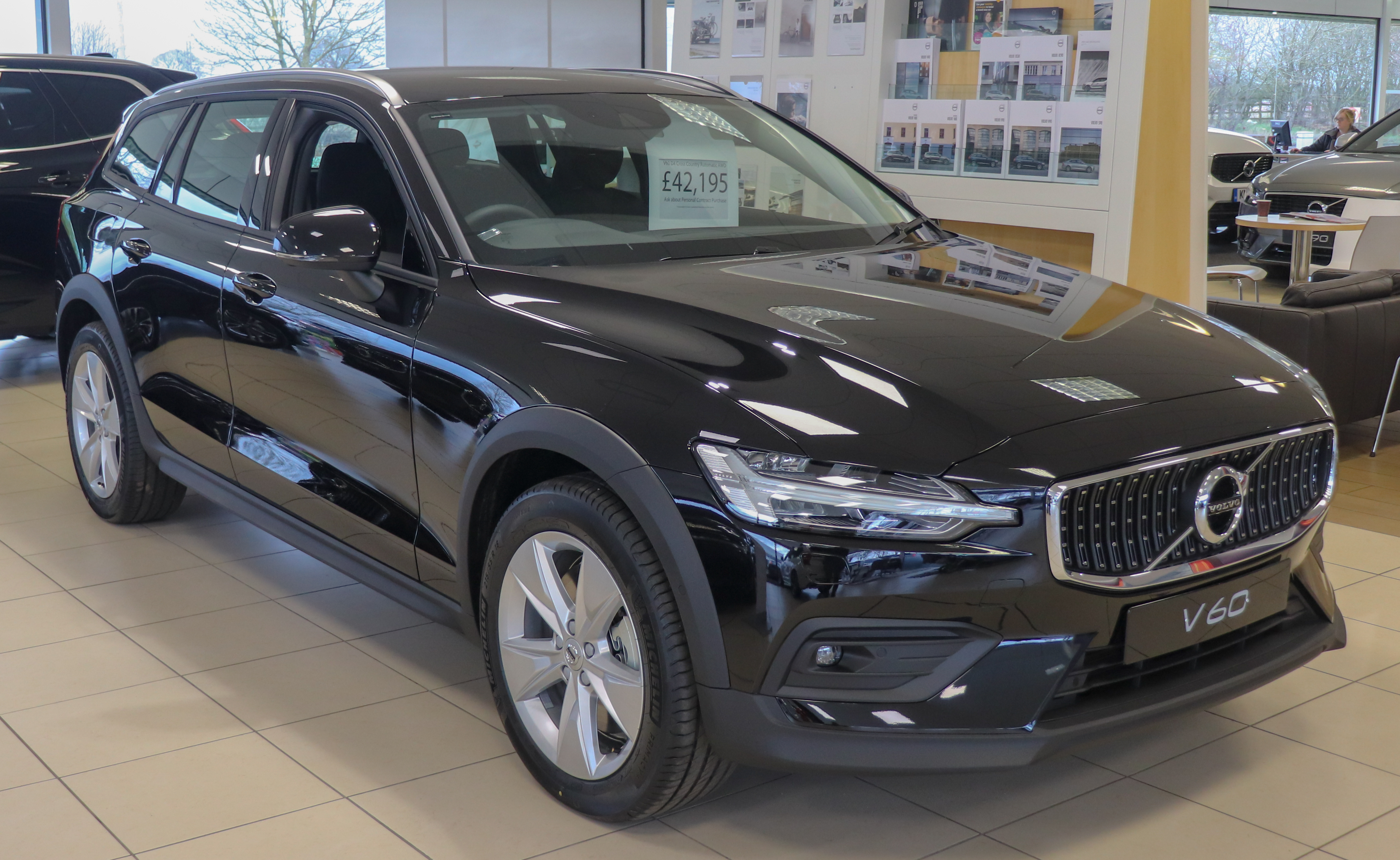
Volvo V60 Cross Country

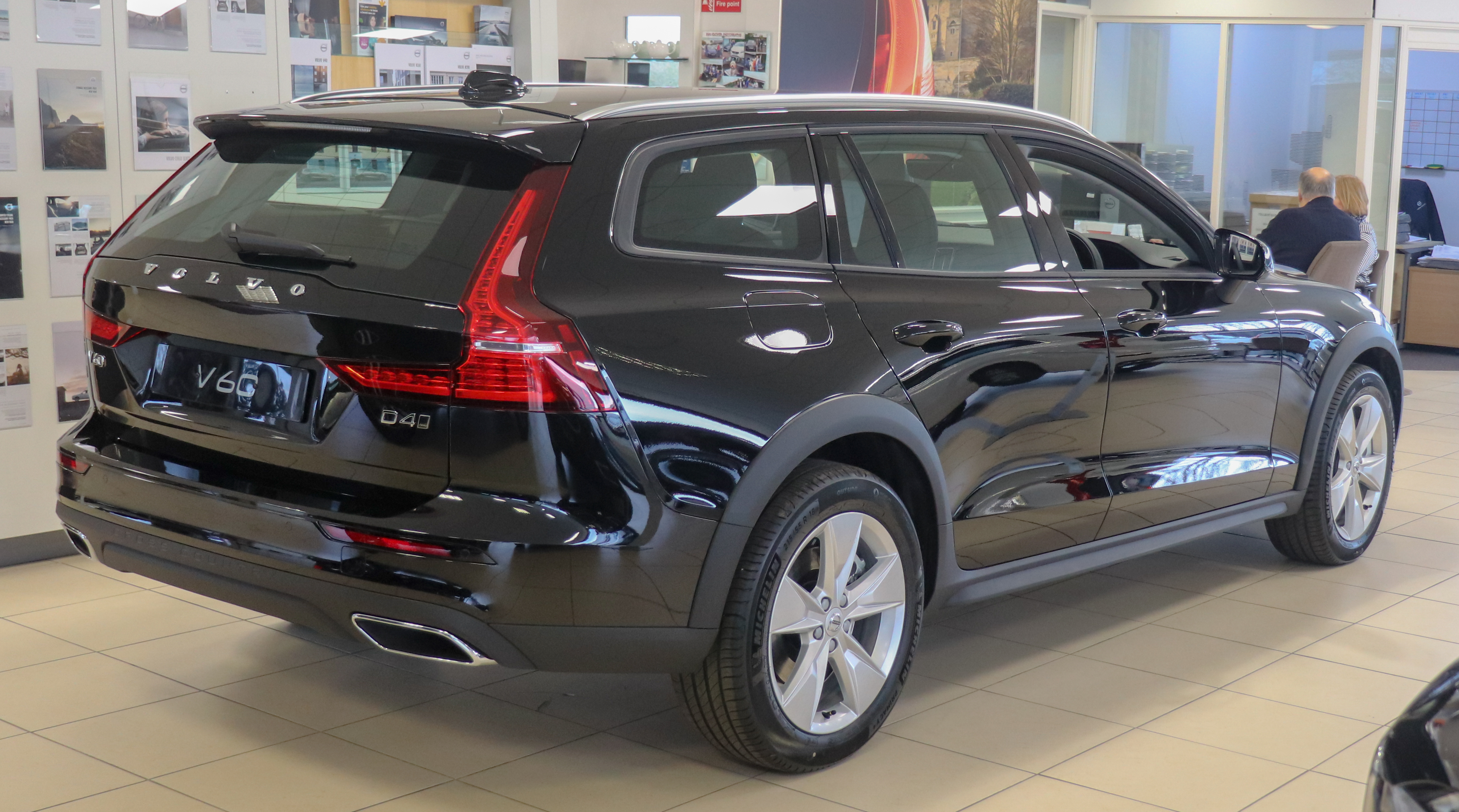
Rear

=== Trim levels ===
Before 2022, the V60 was available in Momentum, R-Design, Inscription, Cross Country and Polestar trim levels. For the 2022 models, Volvo changed the trim levels to Core, Plus and Ultimate (in increasing order of quality and price). It also reduced the optional extras which can be added to the features specified for each trim level, to allow the production process to be streamlined.

In July 2024, it returned in the United Kingdom in Plus and Ultra trim levels, replacing Core, Plus and Ultimate; these are mild-hybrid or plug-in hybrid.

=== Safety ===
ANCAP test results* Volvo V60 (2018, aligned with Euro NCAP)
Test	Points	%
Overall:	5 /5 stars	
Adult occupant:	36.5	96%
Child occupant:	43.2	88%
Pedestrian:	35.7	74%
Safety assist:	10.1	77%

=== Engines ===
Petrol engines
Model	Year(s)	Power	Torque	Displacement	Comment
B3	2020–present	163 PS (120 kW; 161 hp) at 4800 rpm	265 N⋅m (195 lb⋅ft) at 1500–3900 rpm	1,969 cc (120.2 cu in)	I4 turbo
B4	2020–present	197 PS (145 kW; 194 hp) at 4800–5400 rpm	300 N⋅m (221 lb⋅ft) at 1500–4200 rpm	1,969 cc (120.2 cu in)	I4 turbo
B5	2023–present	250 PS (184 kW; 247 hp) at 5400–5700 rpm	350 N⋅m (258 lb⋅ft) at 1800–4800 rpm	1,969 cc (120.2 cu in)	I4 turbo
B6	2021–2023	300 PS (221 kW; 296 hp)	420 N⋅m (310 lb⋅ft)	1,969 cc (120.2 cu in)	I4 turbo/supercharged
T4	2019	190 PS (140 kW; 187 hp) at 5000 rpm	300 N⋅m (221 lb⋅ft) at 1700–4000 rpm	1,969 cc (120.2 cu in)	I4 turbo
T5	2019–2022	250 PS (184 kW; 247 hp)	350 N⋅m (258 lb⋅ft)	1,969 cc (120.2 cu in)	I4 turbo
T6	2019	310 PS (228 kW; 306 hp) at 5700 rpm	400 N⋅m (295 lb⋅ft) at 2200–5100 rpm	1,969 cc (120.2 cu in)	I4 turbo/supercharged
T6 Twin Engine / Recharge	2019–present	350 PS (257 kW; 345 hp)	590 N⋅m (435 lb⋅ft)	1,969 cc (120.2 cu in)	I4 turbo PHEV
T8	2019–2022	390 PS (287 kW; 385 hp)	640 N⋅m (472 lb⋅ft)	1,969 cc (120.2 cu in)	I4 turbo/supercharged PHEV
T8 Recharge	2022–present	455 PS (335 kW; 449 hp); 462 PS (340 kW; 456 hp)	709 N⋅m (523 lb⋅ft)	1,969 cc (120.2 cu in)	I4 turbo PHEV
T8 Polestar Engineered	2019–2022	405 PS (298 kW; 399 hp)	670 N⋅m (494 lb⋅ft)	1,969 cc (120.2 cu in)	I4 turbo/supercharged PHEV
T8 Polestar Engineered	2022–present	455 PS (335 kW; 449 hp); 462 PS (340 kW; 456 hp)	709 N⋅m (523 lb⋅ft)	1,969 cc (120.2 cu in)	I4 turbo PHEV

Diesel engines
Model	Year(s)	Power at rpm	Torque at rpm	Displacement	Comment
D3; V60CC D3 AWD	2019–present	150 PS (110 kW; 148 hp) at 3750	320 N⋅m (236 lb⋅ft) at 1750–3000	1,969 cc (120.2 cu in)	I4 turbo
D4; D4 AWD; V60CC D4; V60CC D4 AWD	2019–present	190 PS (140 kW; 187 hp) at 4250	400 N⋅m (295 lb⋅ft) at 1750–2500	1,969 cc (120.2 cu in)	I4 Twin-turbo
