= Torslanda Church =

Medieval church in Gothenburg, Sweden

Coordinates: 57°43′30.15″N 11°46′8.6″E

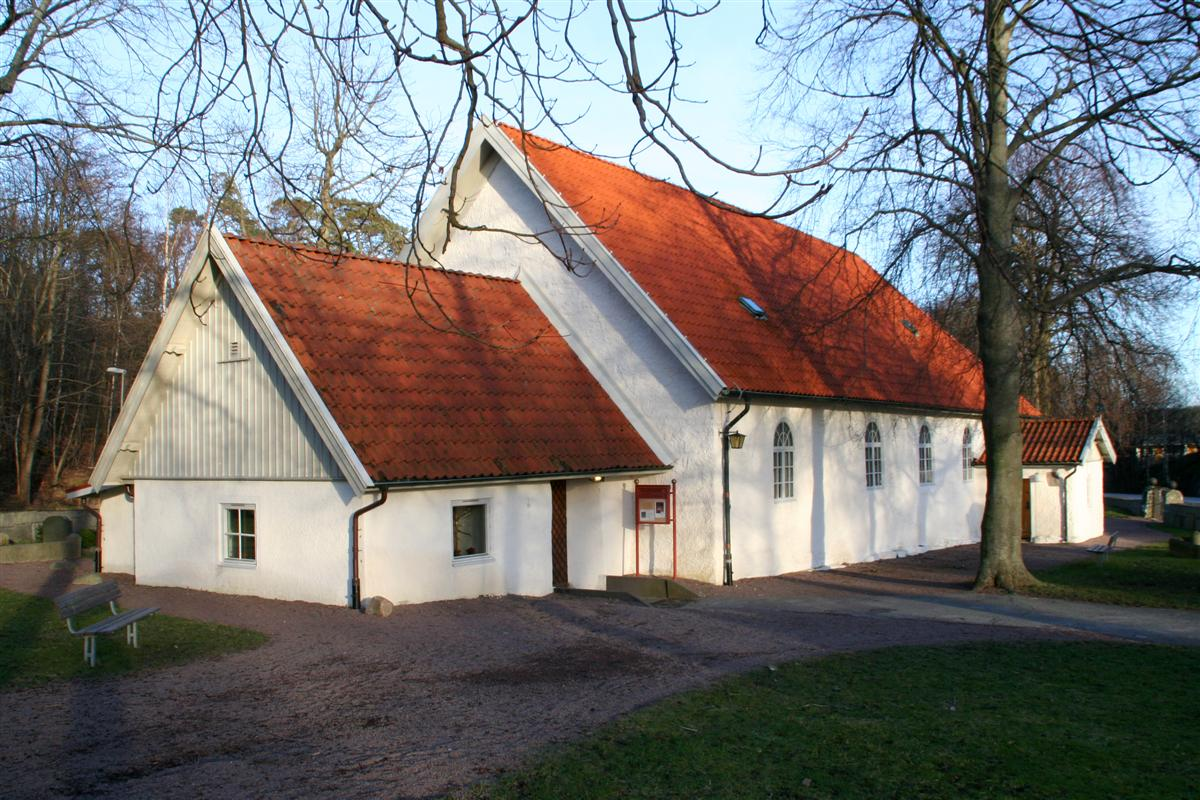
Torslanda Church

The Torslanda Church (Swedish: Torslanda kyrka) is a medieval church in Gothenburg, Sweden. It is located on the island of Hisingen, in the Torslanda borough, and it belongs to the parish of Torslanda-Björlanda in the Diocese of Gothenburg.

== Building ==
It is one of the oldest churches in Gothenburg and on the island of Hisingen. The oldest part of the building, the nave, is estimated to have been erected in the 12th century. The porch was added in 1766; the choir in 1780, and the sacristy in 1806.

== Interior ==
Some of the interiors of the church is also notable. There are two baptismal fonts - one made of stone, dating back to the 13th century, and a wooden one from the 16th century. The wooden pulpit was built in 1627. There is also a crucifix hanging above the entrance to the choir, made in the late 15th century and renovated in 1896.

The 15th century altarpiece depicts God surrounded by the Twelve Apostles. However, Judas Iscariot is not present - he is substituted by the king Olaf II of Norway with a wild beast under his feet. This symbolizes the triumph of Christianity over paganism in Norway.
