= Torslanda =

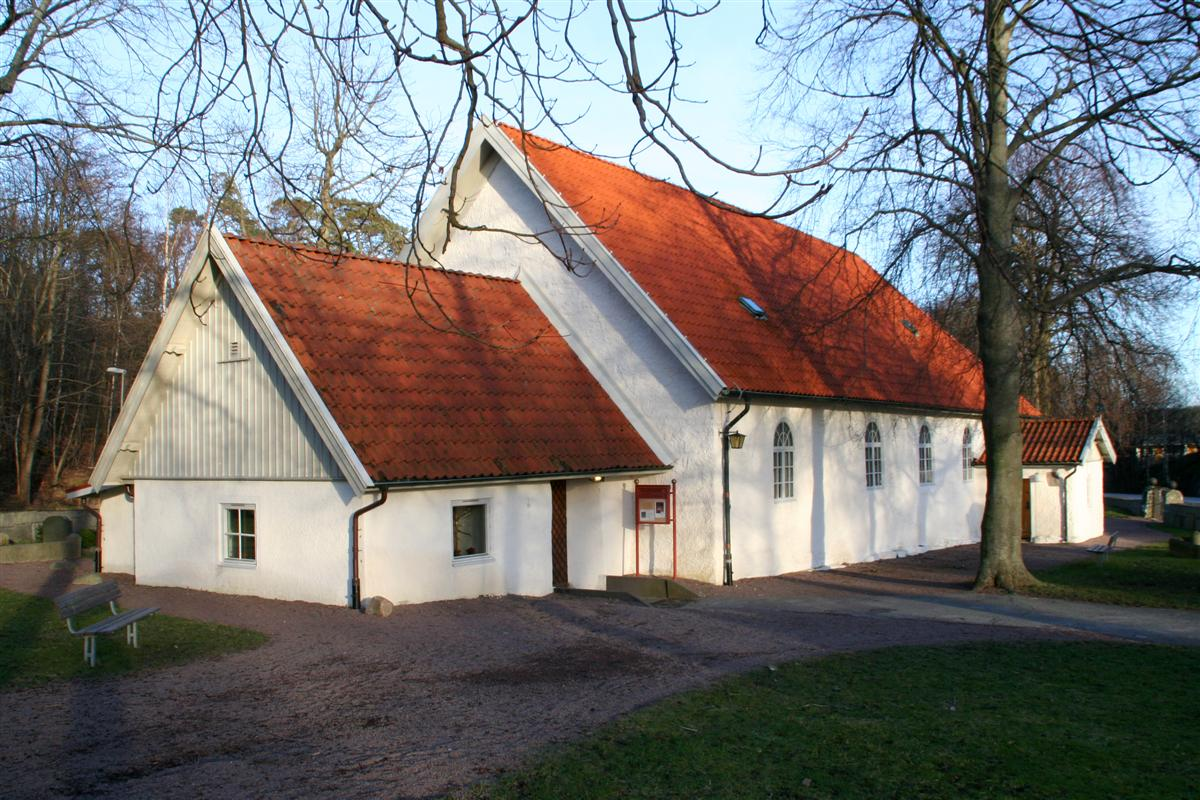
- Torslanda Church

- Location within Västra Götaland Location within Sweden
- Coordinates: 57°43′N 11°46′E
- Country: Sweden
- Province: Bohuslän
- County: Västra Götaland County
- Municipality: Gothenburg Municipality

Area
  - Total: 5.67 km^{2} (2.19 sq mi)

Population (2005-12-31)
  - Total: 10,129
  - Density: 1,786/km^{2} (4,630/sq mi)
- Time zone: UTC+1 (CET)
  - Summer (DST): UTC+2 (CEST)

Torslanda is an urban district situated in Gothenburg Municipality, Västra Götaland County, Sweden. It had 10,129 inhabitants in 2005.

== Etymology ==
A Norse pagan place of sacrifice to the God Thor was once located here, which gave rise to the name Torslanda; meaning "Thor's land".

== The Volvo Torslanda Plant ==
Volvo Cars operates one of its largest automobile plants, Torslandaverken in Torslanda, under the motto "Increased capacity – for ever-higher quality". It opened in 1964 and some models produced at the plant have carried the Torslanda name, including later versions of the Volvo 240 during the early 1990s. It also holds the headquarters for Volvo Car Corporation, AB Volvo, and Polestar.

== Torslanda Airport ==
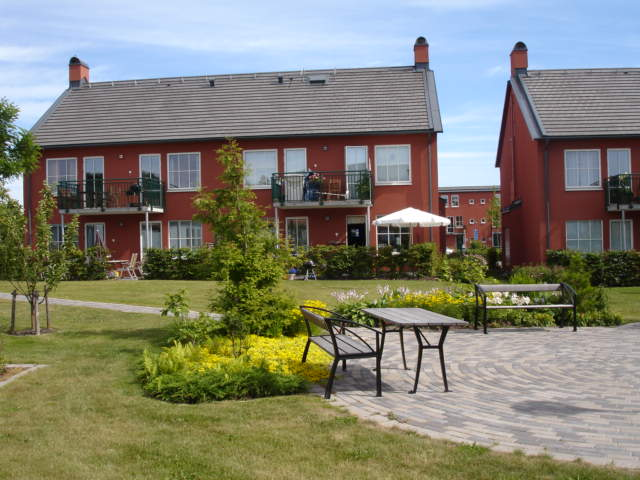
Amhult, redeveloped from the Torslanda Airport

From 1923 to 1977, prior to the opening of the Göteborg Landvetter Airport, the city had been served by the Torslanda Airport, located here. The control tower, located on a hilltop adjacent to the site of the airport, was renovated in 2007, and is one of the last remaining artifacts of the airport, much of which was demolished in 1997.

In recent years, the original land from the Torslanda Airport has been redeveloped into a residential area known as Amhult, eventually to become a garden village with 900 new homes, a commercial centre, preschool and school.

== The Volvo Museum ==
After the closing of the Torslanda Airport as an actual transportation facility (1977), Volvo housed its collection of historic vehicles in the "Blue Hangar" (Den Blå Hangaren) at Torslanda Airport. The collection comprised about 5-6 vehicles, only two of them in working order. Other vehicles were stored across Sweden in various Volvo facilities. Unfortunately, fire destroyed the hangar a few years later, but most of the vehicles escaped unharmed. The collection was moved into a permanent location with the opening of the Volvo Museum in Arendal on Hisingen on 30 May 1995.

Notably, The Blue Hangar was destroyed by a fire, 31 May 1980; a monument marks the place where the hangar stood.

Prior to its use as a de facto museum, the Torslanda Airport hangars had served as presentation spaces for prominent vehicle debuts, including the 1957 Volvo P1900/Sport.

== Jack the Ripper and Torslanda ==
Elizabeth Stride, née Elisabeth Gustafsdotter — believed to have been the third victim of the notorious unidentified serial killer Jack the Ripper — hailed from Torslanda, and had been christened at the Torslanda Church (pictured above).

== Sports ==
The following sports clubs are located in Torslanda:

- Torslanda IK
- Edelman FC
