= Volvo Concept Estate =

Concept car

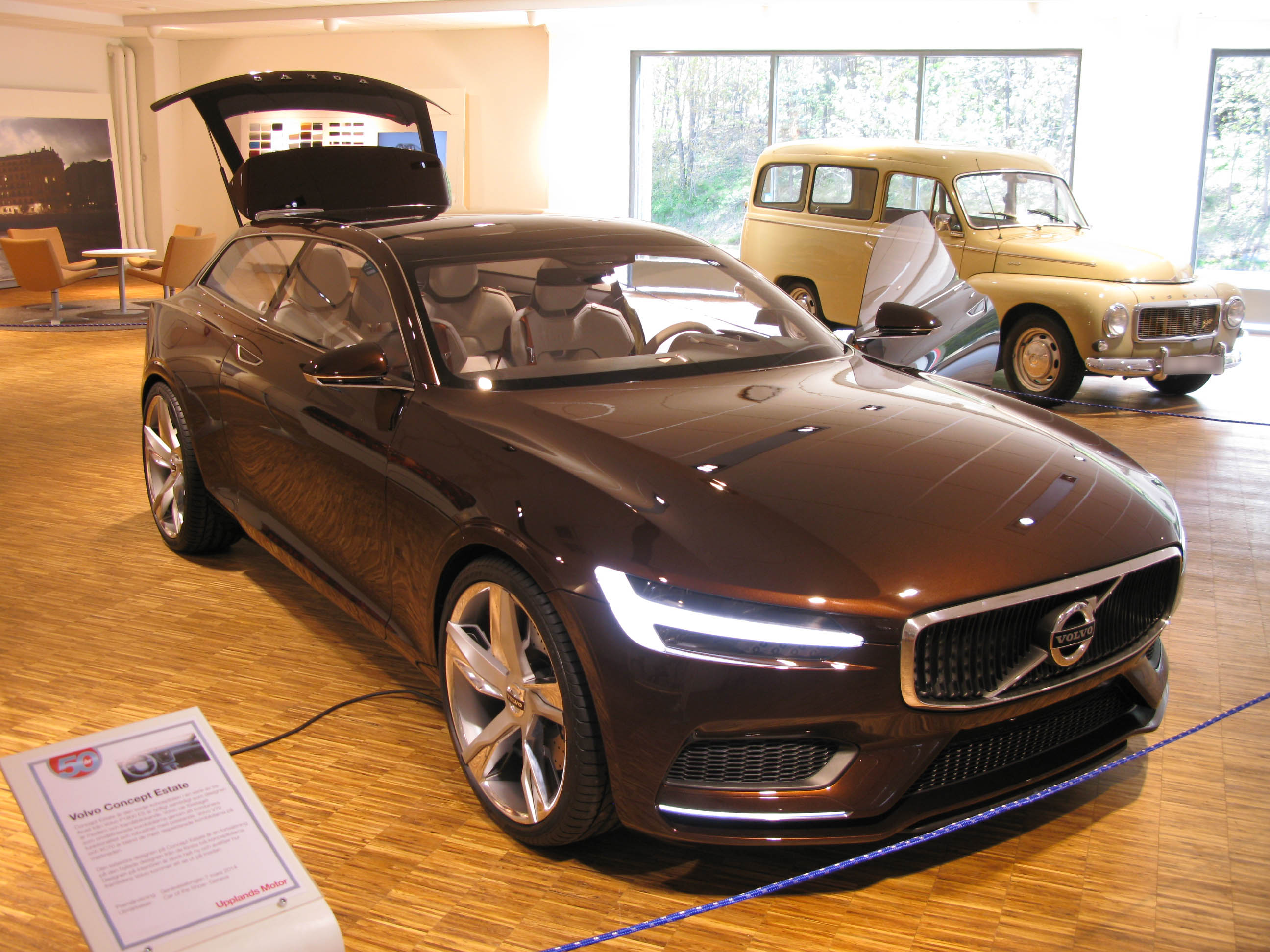
- Volvo Concept Estate, with the Volvo Duett in the background

Overview
- Manufacturer: Volvo
- Production: 2014
- Designer: Thomas Ingenlath

Body and chassis
- Class: Concept car
- Body style: 2-door estate
- Platform: Scalable Product Architecture (SPA)
- Related: Volvo Concept Coupe; Volvo Concept XC Coupe

Powertrain
- Engine: 2.0 L twincharged 4-cylinder

The Volvo Concept Estate is a concept car which was first unveiled at the 2014 Geneva Motor Show. The Volvo Concept Estate was the last of three concept cars designed by the head of design of Volvo, Thomas Ingenlath, which was intending to point the way for the future design direction of Volvo.

The basic design was shared with the preceding Volvo Concept Coupe and Volvo Concept XC Coupe, while the Concept Estate is a shooting brake like the 1800 ES of the 1970s. The Concept Estate is based on the new platform by Volvo the Scalable Product Architecture (SPA) which currently provides the technical foundation for all future models of Volvo, which started with the second generation XC90 in May 2014.
