= Volvo Concept XC Coupe =

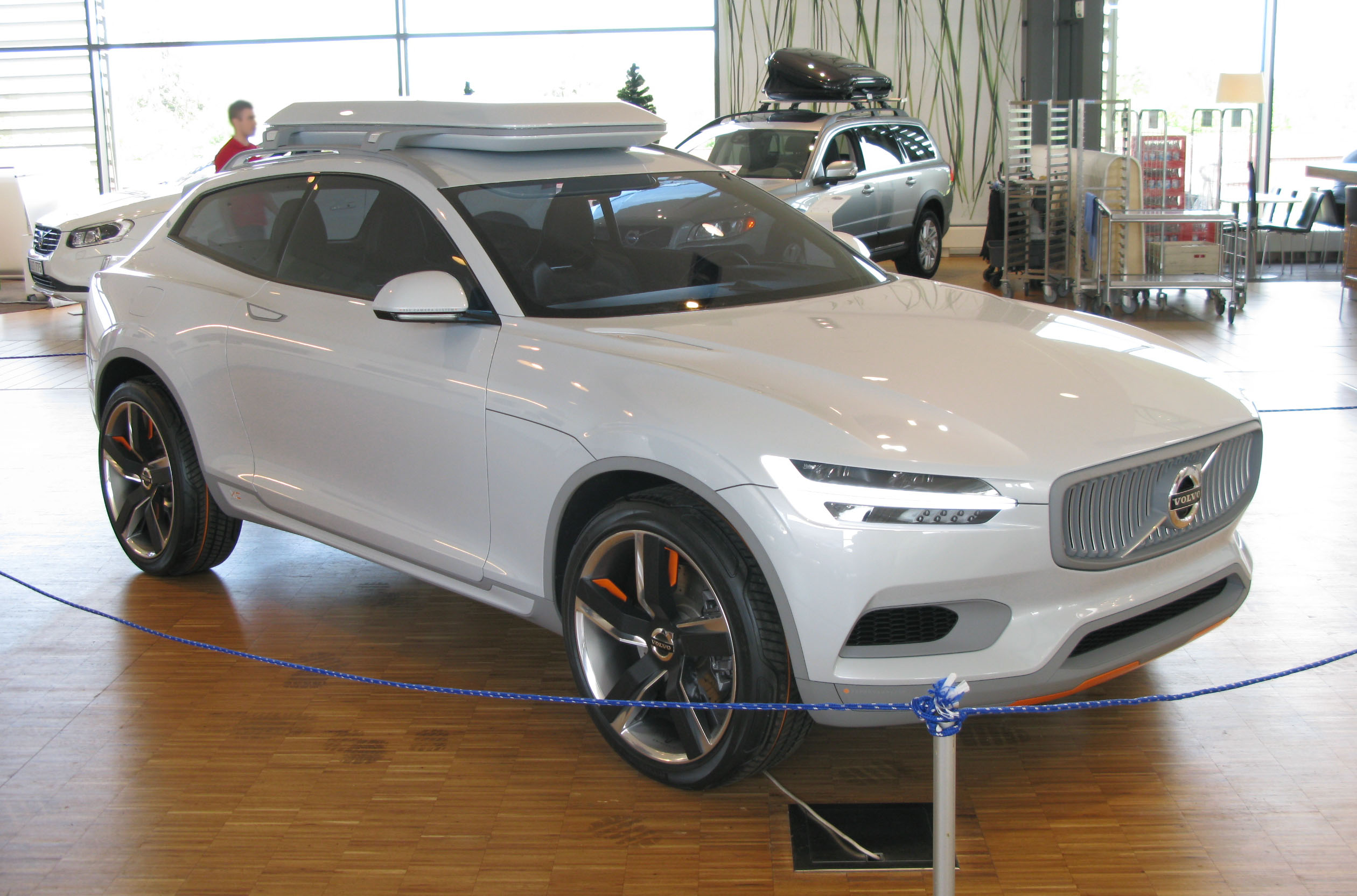

Overview
- Manufacturer: Volvo
- Production: 2014
- Designer: Thomas Ingenlath

Body and chassis
- Class: Concept car
- Body style: 2-door crossover
- Platform: Scalable Product Architecture (SCA)
- Related: Volvo Concept Coupe; Volvo Concept Estate

Powertrain
- Engine: 2.0 L twincharged 4-cylinder

The Volvo Concept XC Coupé is a concept car that was first revealed at the 2014 North American International Auto Show. The vehicle was the second of three planned concept cars designed by the head of design at Volvo, Thomas Ingenlath intended to point the way for the firm's future design direction. The basic design is shared with the Volvo Concept Coupé, which was introduced at the 2013 Frankfurt Motor Show.

The Concept XC Coupé was based on the then-new platform Scalable Product Architecture (SPA), which was intended to provide the technical foundation for all future Volvo models, as revealed in December 2013.

== Gallery ==
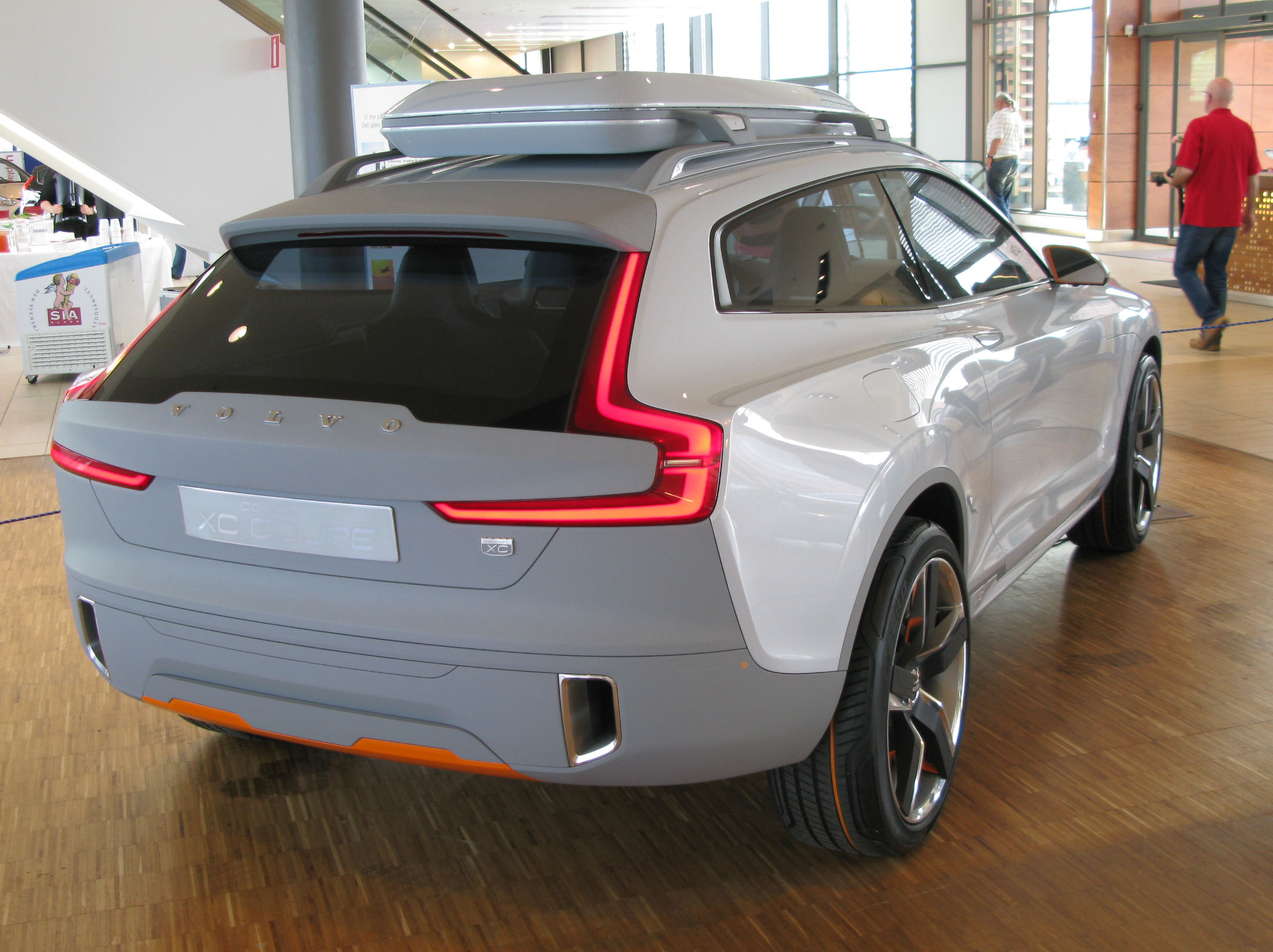
Rear view

== See also ==
- Volvo C30
