= Volvo Concept Coupe =

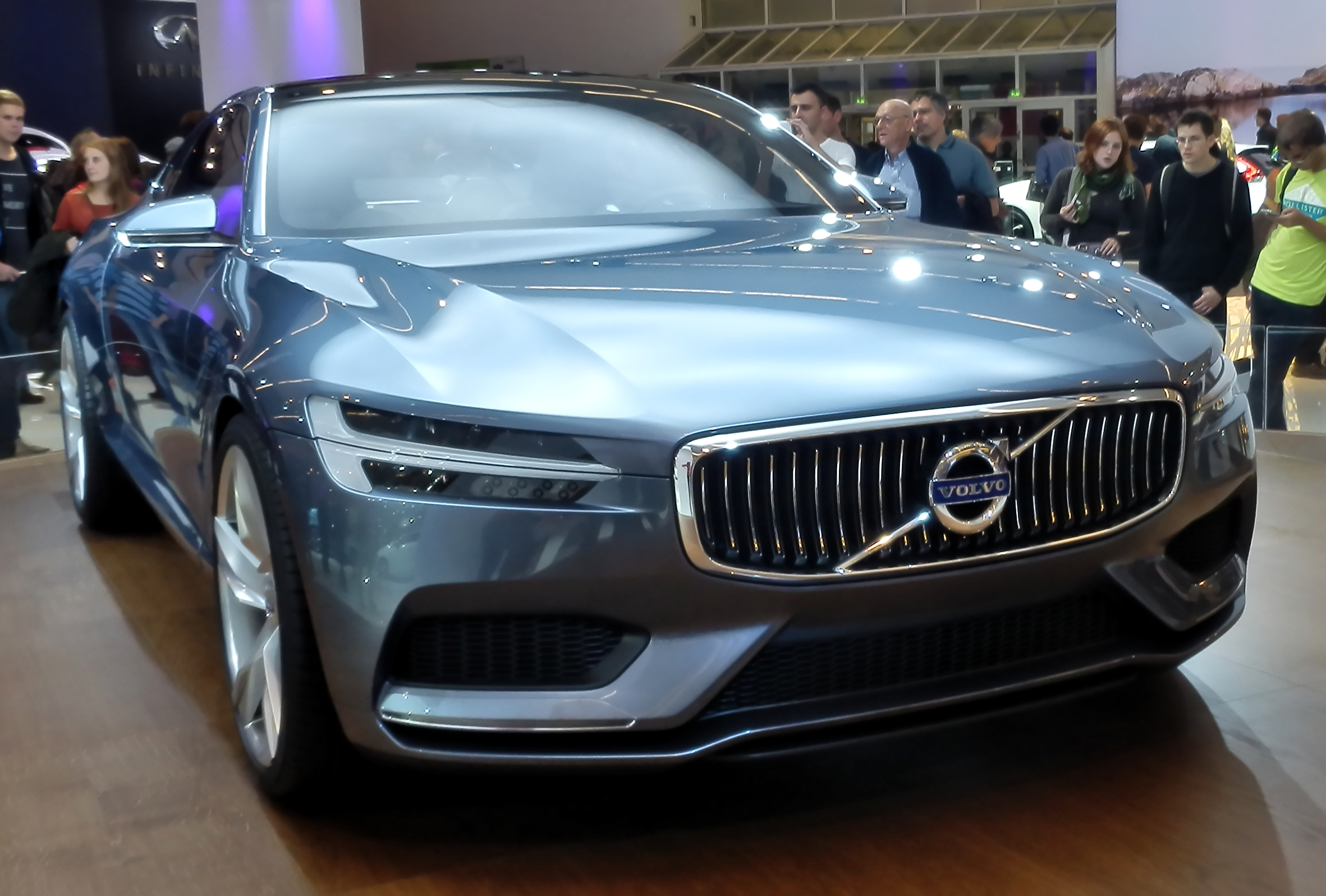
- The Volvo Concept Coupe on display at the 2013 Frankfurt Motor Show with a Volvo P1800 in the background

Overview
- Manufacturer: Volvo
- Production: 2013
- Designer: Thomas Ingenlath

Body and chassis
- Class: Concept car
- Body style: 2-door coupe
- Layout: Front-engine, rear-wheel drive
- Platform: Scalable Product Architecture (SPA)
- Related: Volvo Concept XC Coupe; Volvo Concept Estate; Polestar 1 (production model)

Powertrain
- Engine: 2.0 L twincharged 4-cylinder
- Hybrid drivetrain: PHEV

The Volvo Concept Coupe is a concept car that was first revealed at the 2013 Frankfurt Motor Show. The concept car was based on Volvo's new platform Scalable Product Architecture (SPA), designed to provide the technical foundation for future Volvo models.

The front wheels are driven by a four-cylinder, two-litre petrol engine from Volvo's Volvo Engine Architecture (VEA) engine family, fed by both turbocharger and supercharger. The rear wheels are driven by an electric motor, making this car a plug in hybrid.

The engines have a combined peak power of 400 PS (294 kW; 395 hp) and maximum torque of 600 N⋅m (443 lbf⋅ft). The car was designed by Volvo's head of design Thomas Ingenlath, taking inspiration from the Volvo P1800 of the 1960s. Volvo Cars' subsidiary, Polestar, put the car into production, and re-badged it as the Polestar 1.

== Gallery ==
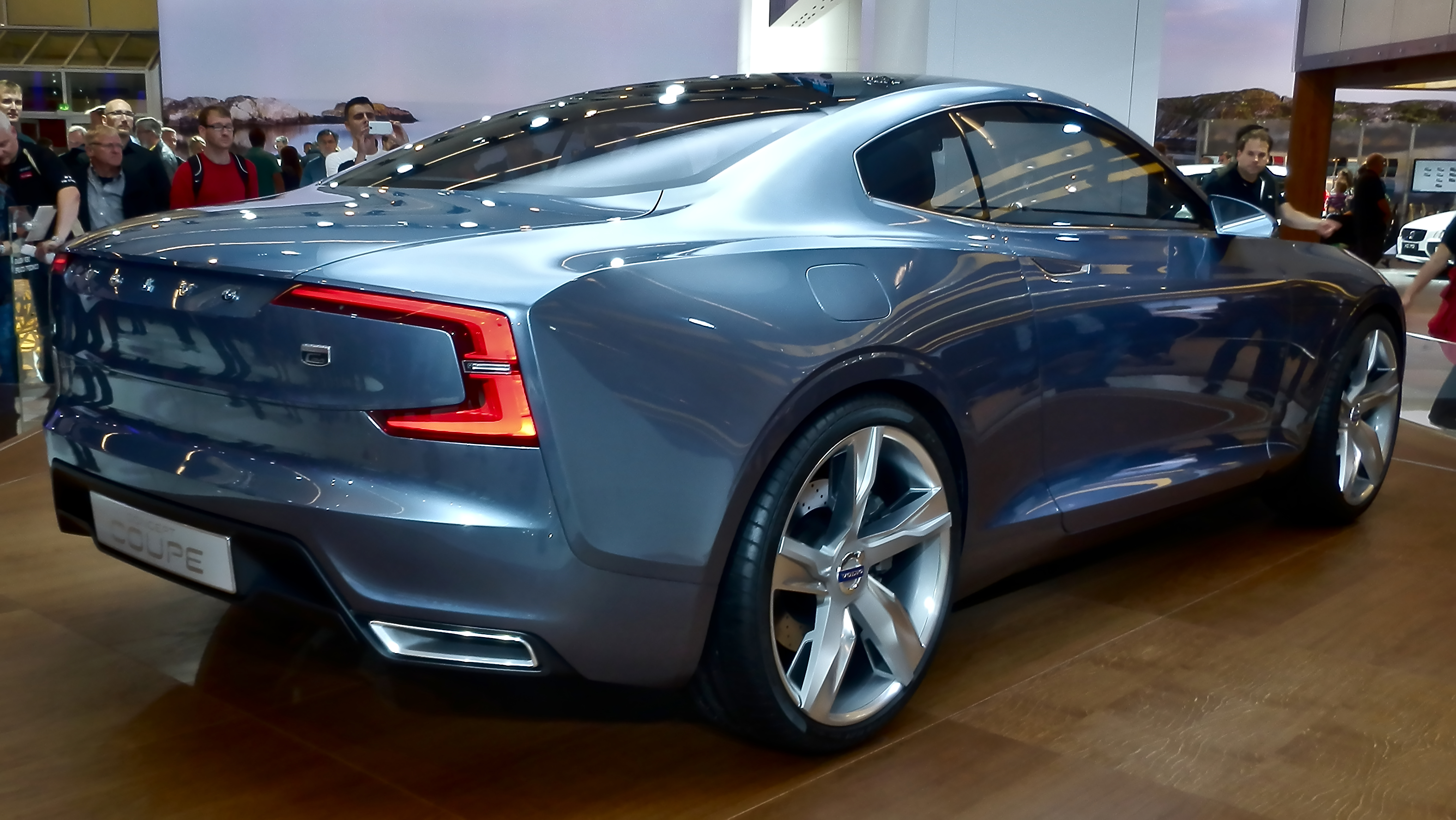
Rear view

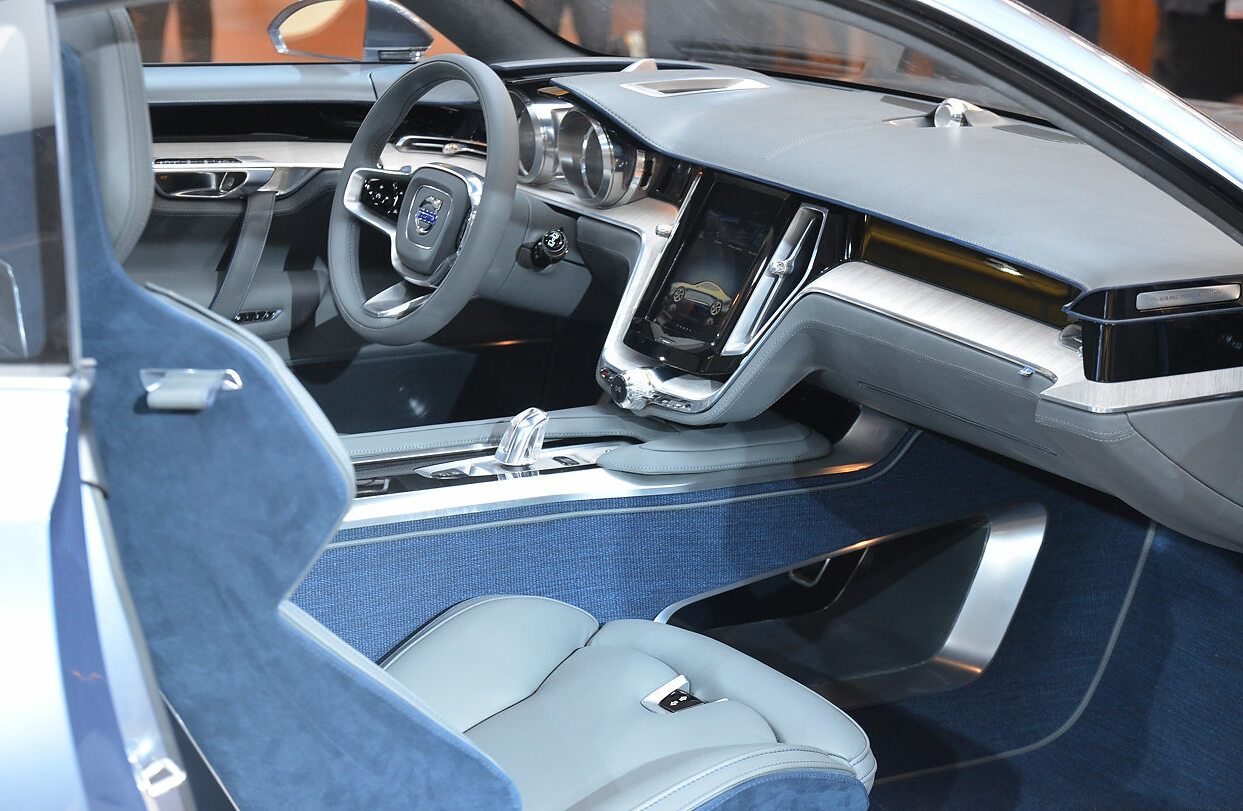
Interior
