= Škoda Roomster =

Small family car/panel van

Škoda Roomster (5J)
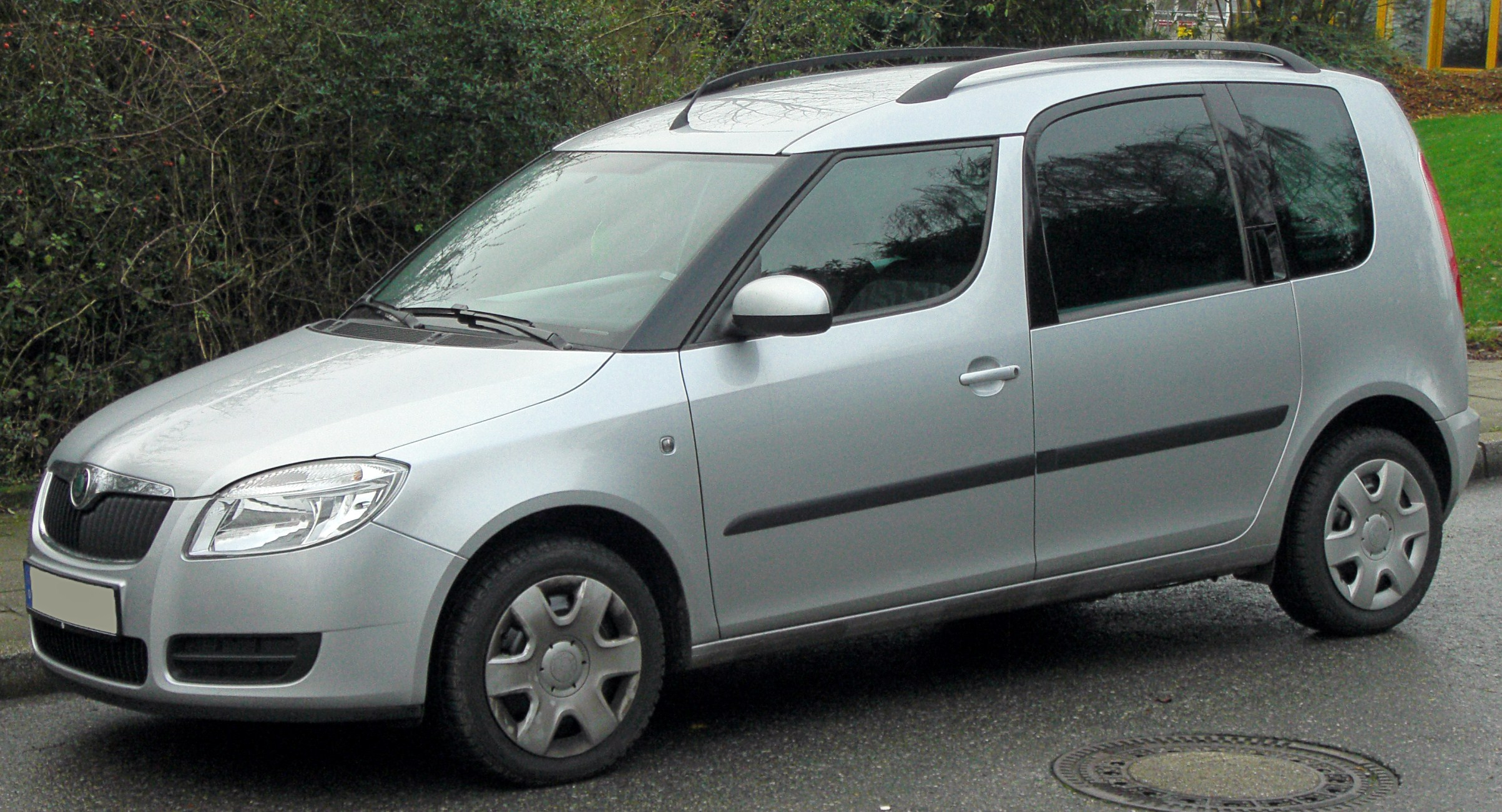

Overview
- Manufacturer: Škoda Auto
- Also called: Skoda Praktik (panel van)
- Production: March 2006–2015
- Assembly: Czech Republic: Kvasiny (2006–2011, 2013–2015); Vrchlabí (2011–2013); Ukraine: Solomonovo (Eurocar); Russia: Kaluga
- Designer: Thomas Ingenlath

Body and chassis
- Class: Small family car (Roomster); Panel van (Praktik)
- Body style: 5-door MPV; 5-door panel van
- Layout: Front-engine, front-wheel-drive
- Platform: Volkswagen Group A04 (PQ24) platform (front); Volkswagen Group A4 (PQ34) (rear)
- Related: Škoda Fabia Mk2

Powertrain
- Engine: petrol: 1.2 L HTP I3; 1.2 L TSI I4; 1.4 L 16V I4; 1.6 L 16V I4; diesel; 1.2 L TDI CR I3; 1.4 L TDI PD I3; 1.6 L TDI CR I4; 1.9 L TDI PD I4
- Transmission: 5-speed manual 6-speed tiptronic 7-speed DSG

Dimensions
- Wheelbase: 2,617 mm (103.0 in)
- Length: 4,205 mm (165.6 in)
- Width: 1,684 mm (66.3 in)
- Height: 1,607 mm (63.3 in)

Chronology
- Predecessor: Škoda 1203; SEAT Inca (indirect)
- Successor: Škoda Yeti

The Škoda Roomster (Type 5J) is a small family car manufactured and marketed by Škoda Auto from 2006 to 2015 over a single generation with a single intermediate facelift. It has a five-door, five passenger, front-engine, front-wheel drive, high-roof design and has been described as a hatchback, an estate car, or a multi-purpose vehicle. Styled by Thomas Ingenlath and Peter Wouda, the Roomster premiered at the 2006 Geneva Motor Show) as the first car marketed after Volkswagen Group's takeover of Skoda, sharing the A4 (PQ34) platform and components with the second generation Škoda Fabia.

Assembled at the Škoda factory in Kvasiny, Rychnov nad Kněžnou District, sales began in June 2006. A five-door, two-seater panel van variant launched in March 2007 as the Škoda Praktik, a name used previously on a panel van version of the Škoda Fabia Combi.

In October 2015, development of the second generation Roomster begun, spy shots of the new Roomster were taken that month revealing that instead of designing a completely new model, the second generation Roomster was to be a rebadged Volkswagen Caddy. In December 2015, development of the second generation Roomster was scrapped so that they could focus on the upcoming Kodiaq mid-size crossover and another reason why development was cancelled is due to cost reasons, leaked images of the second generation Roomster without any camouflage were also spotted with an estimated 100 prototypes built before cancellation.

== Overview ==
The Roomster is based on the concept car of the same name, announced in September 2003 at the Frankfurt Auto Show. The concept was slightly shorter – 4,055 mm (159.6 in) against 4,205 mm (165.6 in) – than the production model with a longer wheelbase – 2,710 mm (106.7 in) against 2,617 mm (103.0 in), and featured a single rear sliding door on the passenger side, which was replaced by two conventionally-hinged swinging rear doors.

The Roomster's cargo arrangement is marketed as VarioFlex, with 40–20–40 split rear seats that can move longitudinally or transversely (by removing the middle seat), recline up to 7°, fold forward — or be removed to form a flat load surface. The load surface can raised or lowered 250 mm (9.8 in).

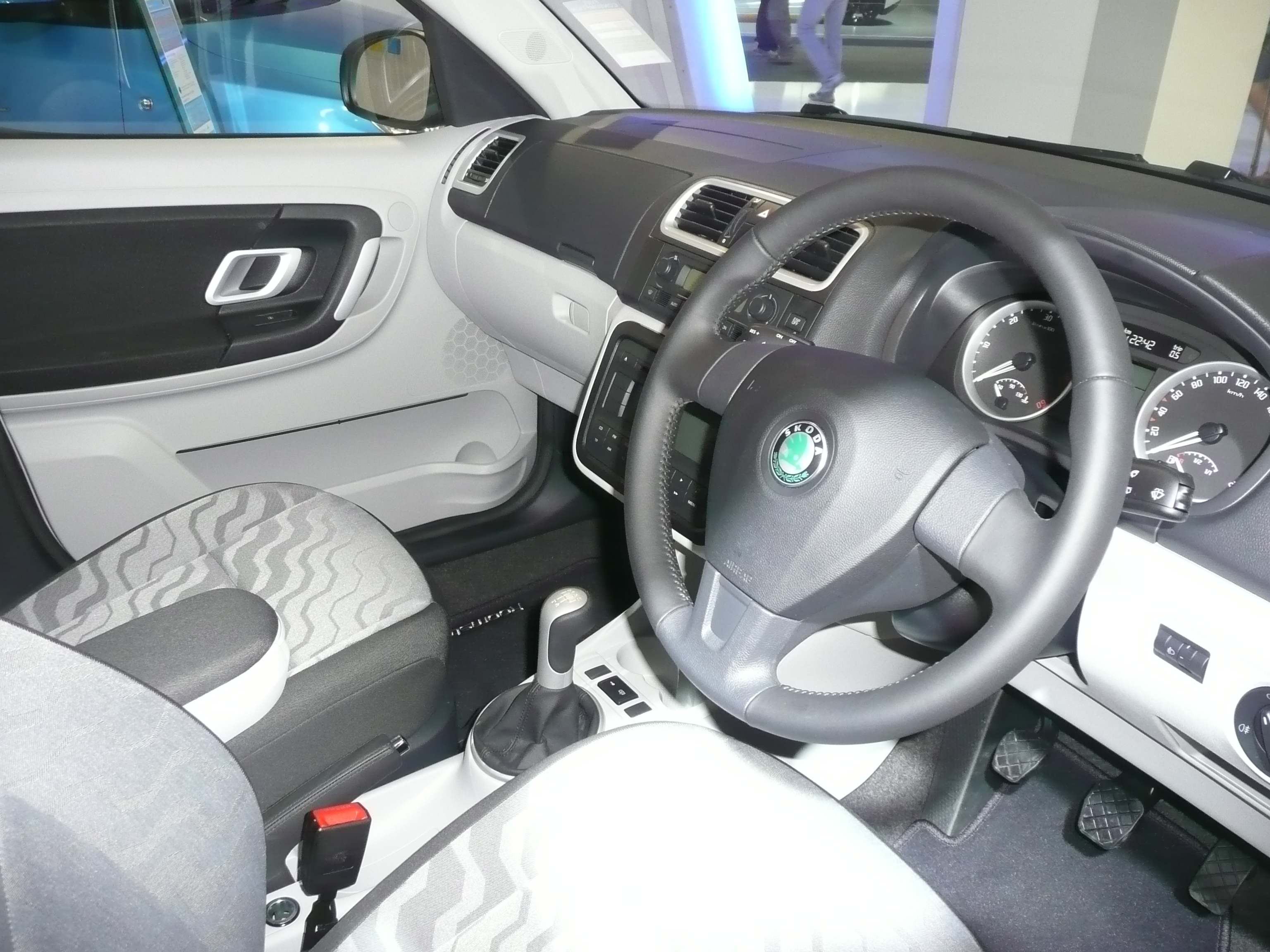
Interior

At launch, the Škoda Roomster used four-stroke engines from the Volkswagen Group. Petrol engines included the multi valve inline three cylinder 1.2-litre, with power initially DIN rated at 47 kilowatts (64 PS; 63 bhp), but with launch of the second generation Fabia rated at 51 kilowatts (69 PS; 68 bhp), followed by the 1.4-litre and 1.6-litre inline four-cylinder EA111 engines, with power of 63 kilowatts (86 PS; 84 bhp) and 77 kilowatts (105 PS; 103 bhp) respectively. The 1.6-litre was also available with a tiptronic six-speed automatic transmission.

Diesel engine propulsion came from the inline three-cylinder 1.4 Turbocharged Direct Injection (TDI), with two power levels, base at 51 kilowatts (69 PS; 68 bhp) and "sport" at 59 kilowatts (80 PS; 79 bhp). The top option was a four-cylinder 1.9 TDI, with 77 kilowatts (105 PS; 103 bhp).

The Roomster could combine standard body colours (both solid and metallic) with a white, black, or silver roof. An offroad-styled Scout trim level was introduced late 2006. A single piece panoramic sunroof is optional.

Euro NCAP test results Skoda Roomster (2006)
Test	Score	Rating
Adult occupant:	34	5 /5 stars
Child occupant:	40	4 /5 stars
Pedestrian:	14	2 /4 stars

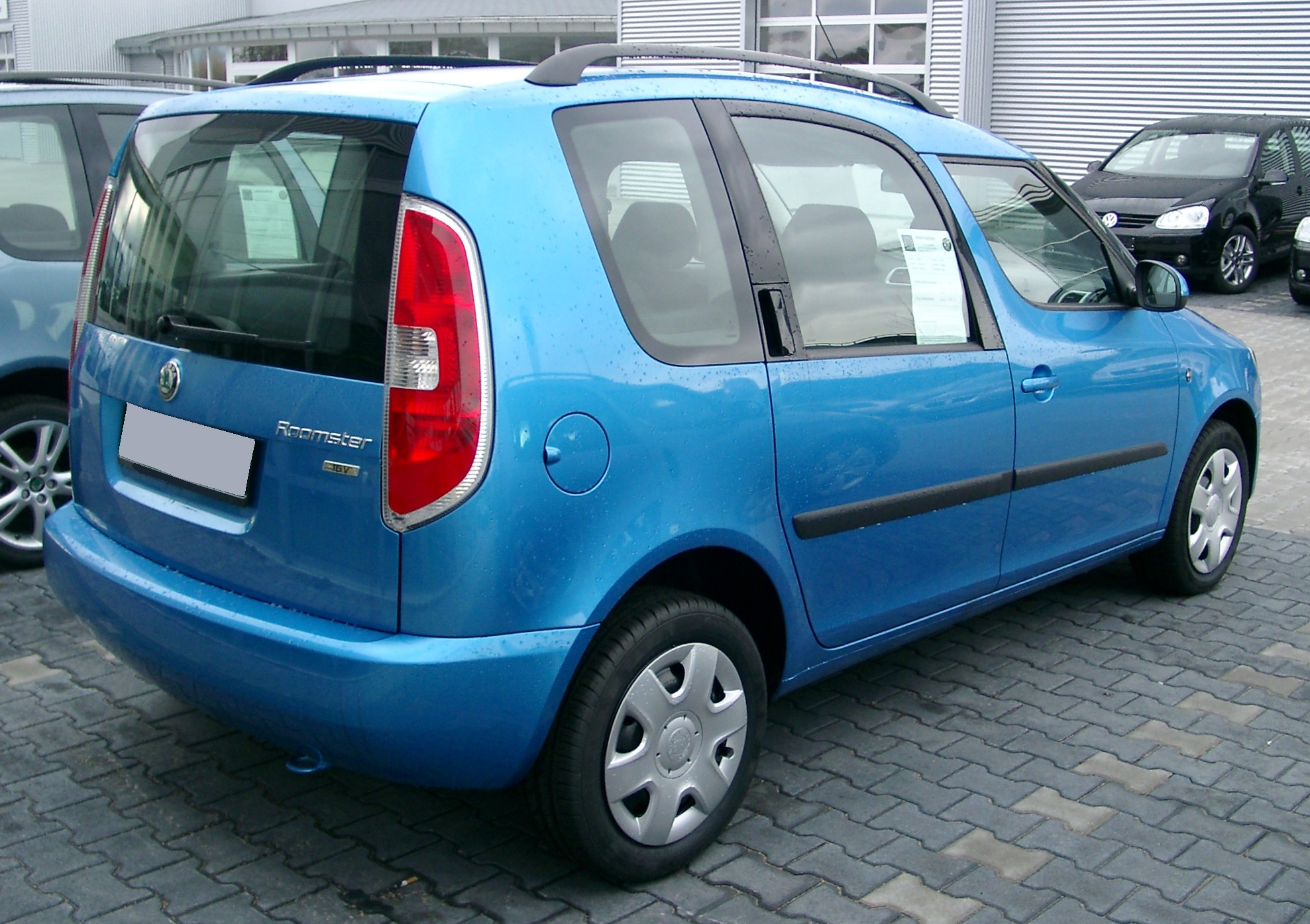
Rear view

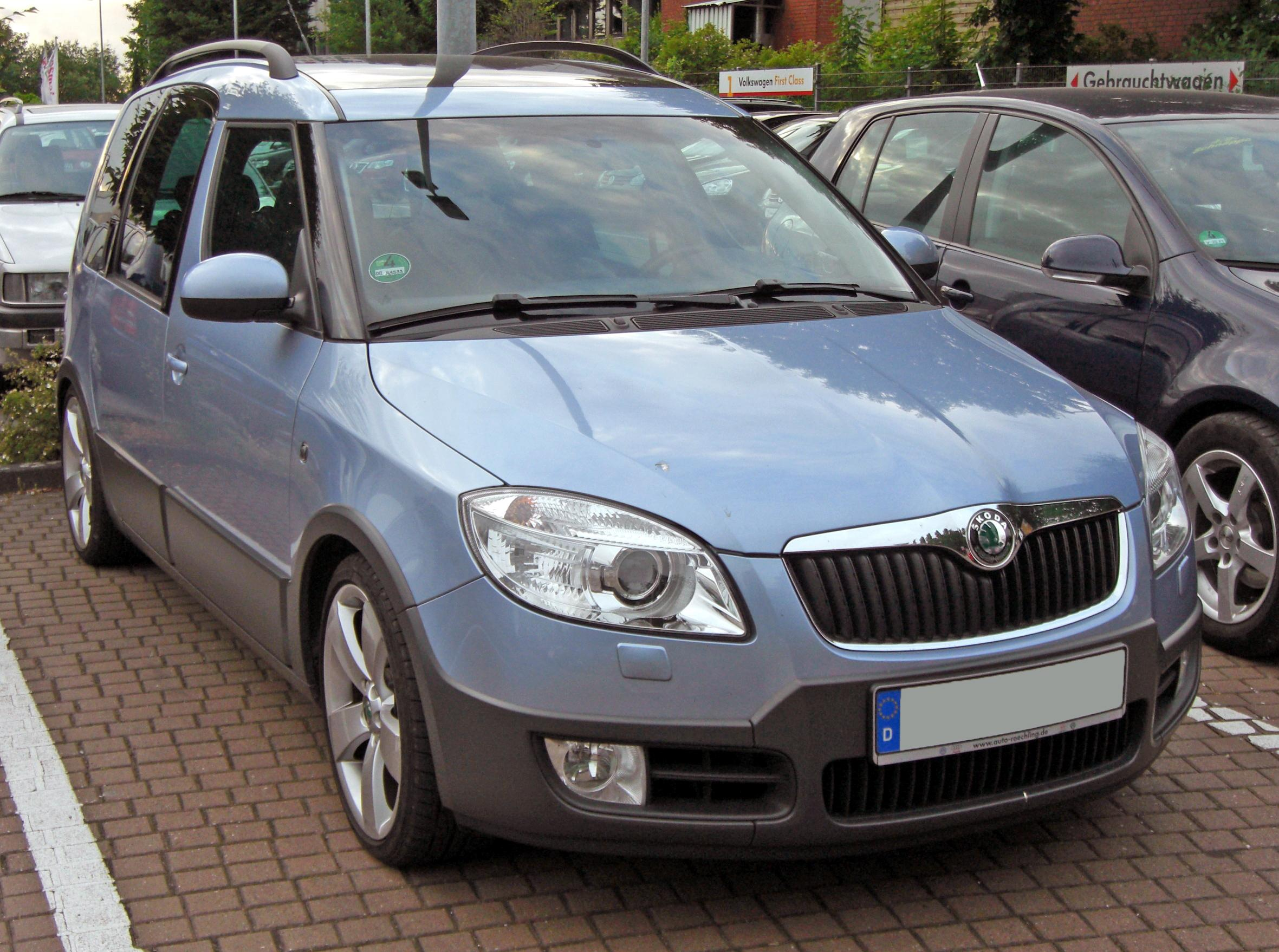
Skoda Roomster Scout

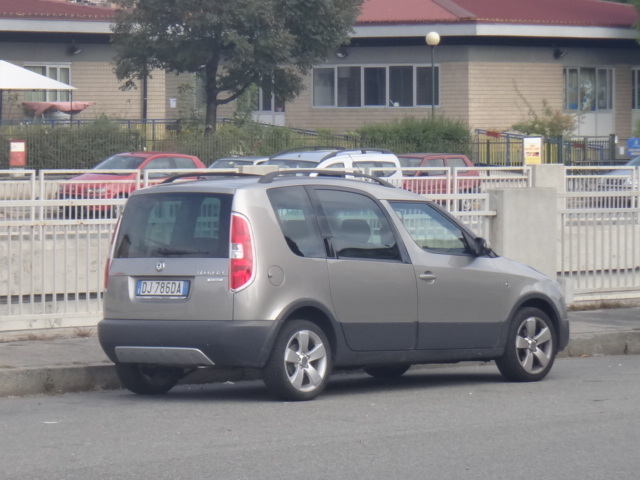
Scout (rear)

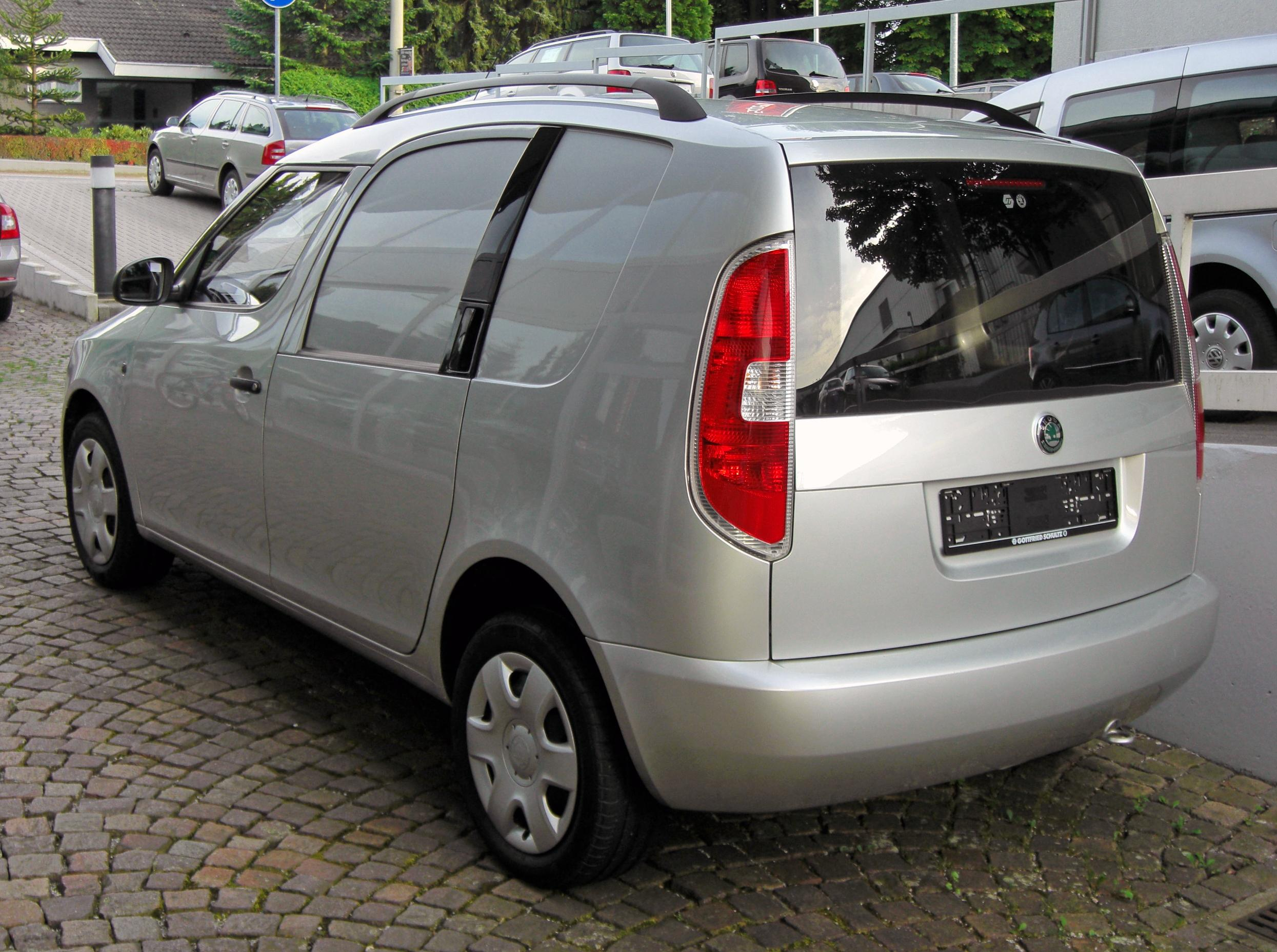
Skoda Praktik

=== Facelift ===
A facelifted Roomster premiered at the 2010 Geneva Motor Show with a revised front fascia and fog lights. Inside, the facelift featured a revised steering wheel. Headlights elements were revised with their housing.

1.2-litre TSI turbocharged petrol engines came as a replacement of the previous 1.4- and 1.6-litre MPI engines, providing significant improvements to fuel consumption and corresponding reductions in CO_{2} emissions.

The Aisin automatic transmission previously used was also replaced with the seven speed dual-clutch Direct-Shift Gearbox (DSG) (optional on 77 kilowatts (105 PS; 103 bhp) 1.2 TSi models), providing a reduction of over 30% in CO_{2} emissions for the 77 kilowatts (105 PS; 103 bhp) automatic derivative (compared to the previous 1.6-litre). Diesel engines were updated to the common rail system and four valve technology. 2008 Skoda Roomster rear.jpg The manufacturer's combined consumption for the Roomster GreenLine with brand new 55 kW, 1.2-litre, three cylinder diesel engine is 4.2 L/100 km, which is 109 g CO_{2} per km.

The design of the Roomster Scout also evolved (front bumpers, front fog lights).

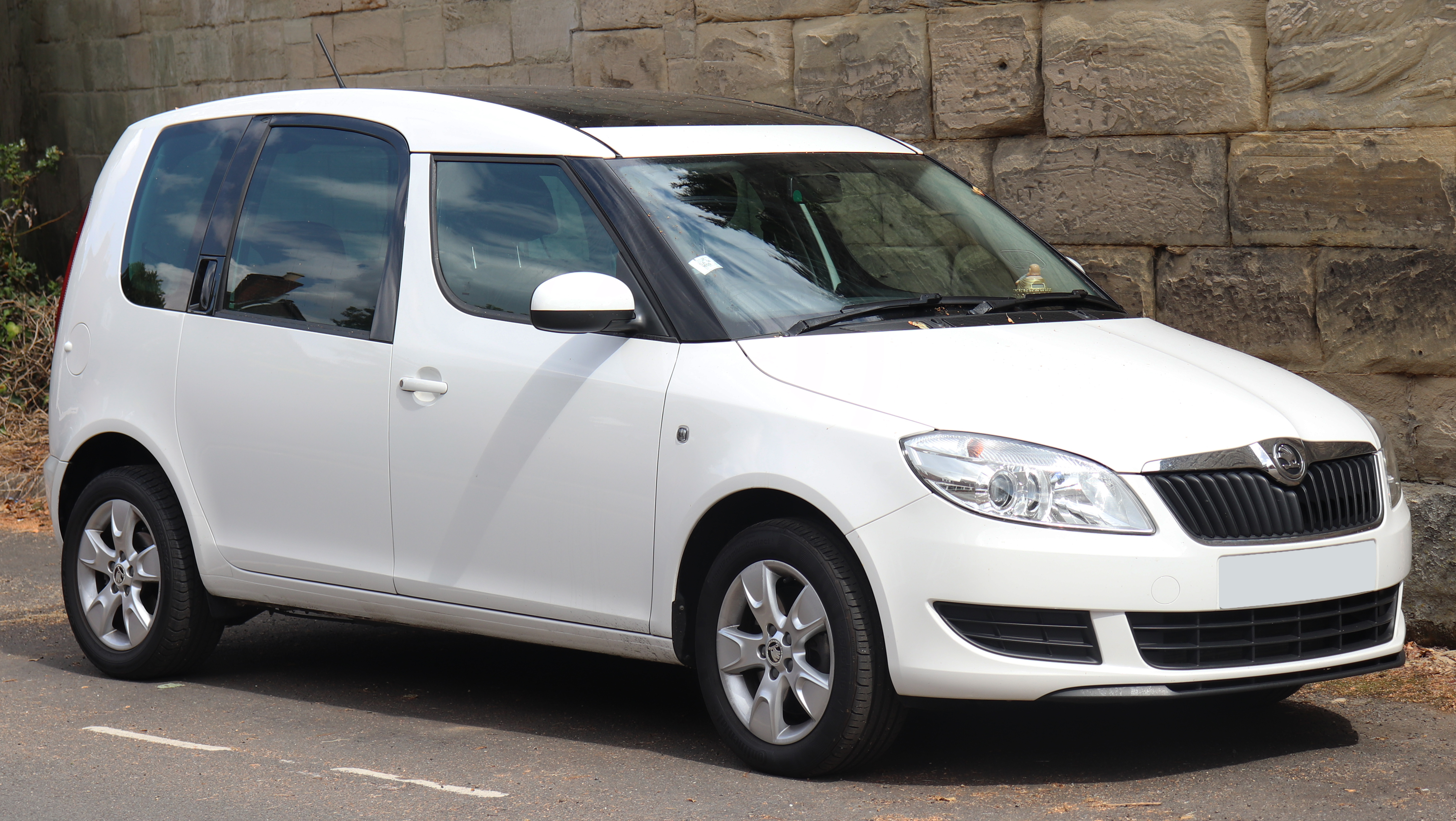
Front

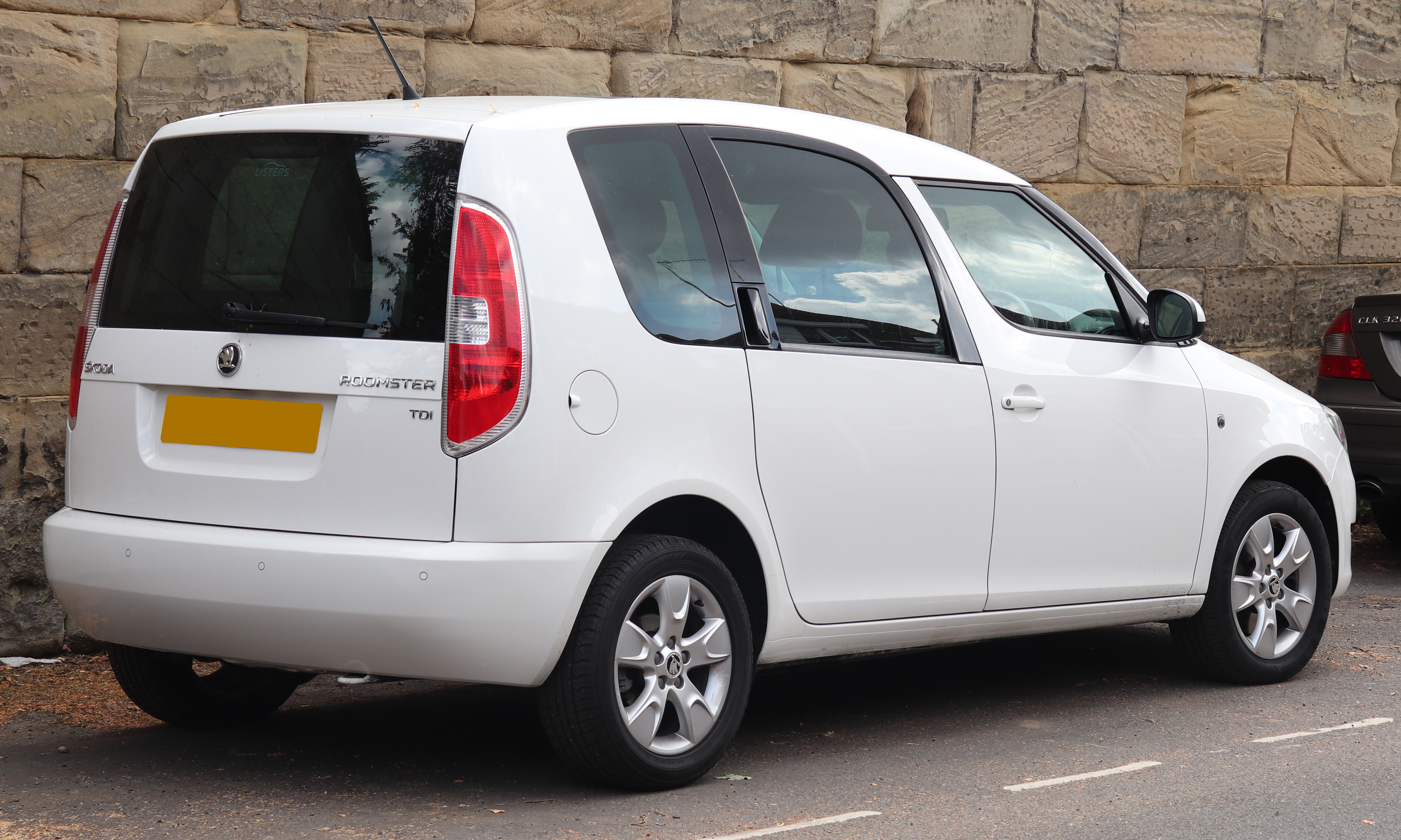
Rear

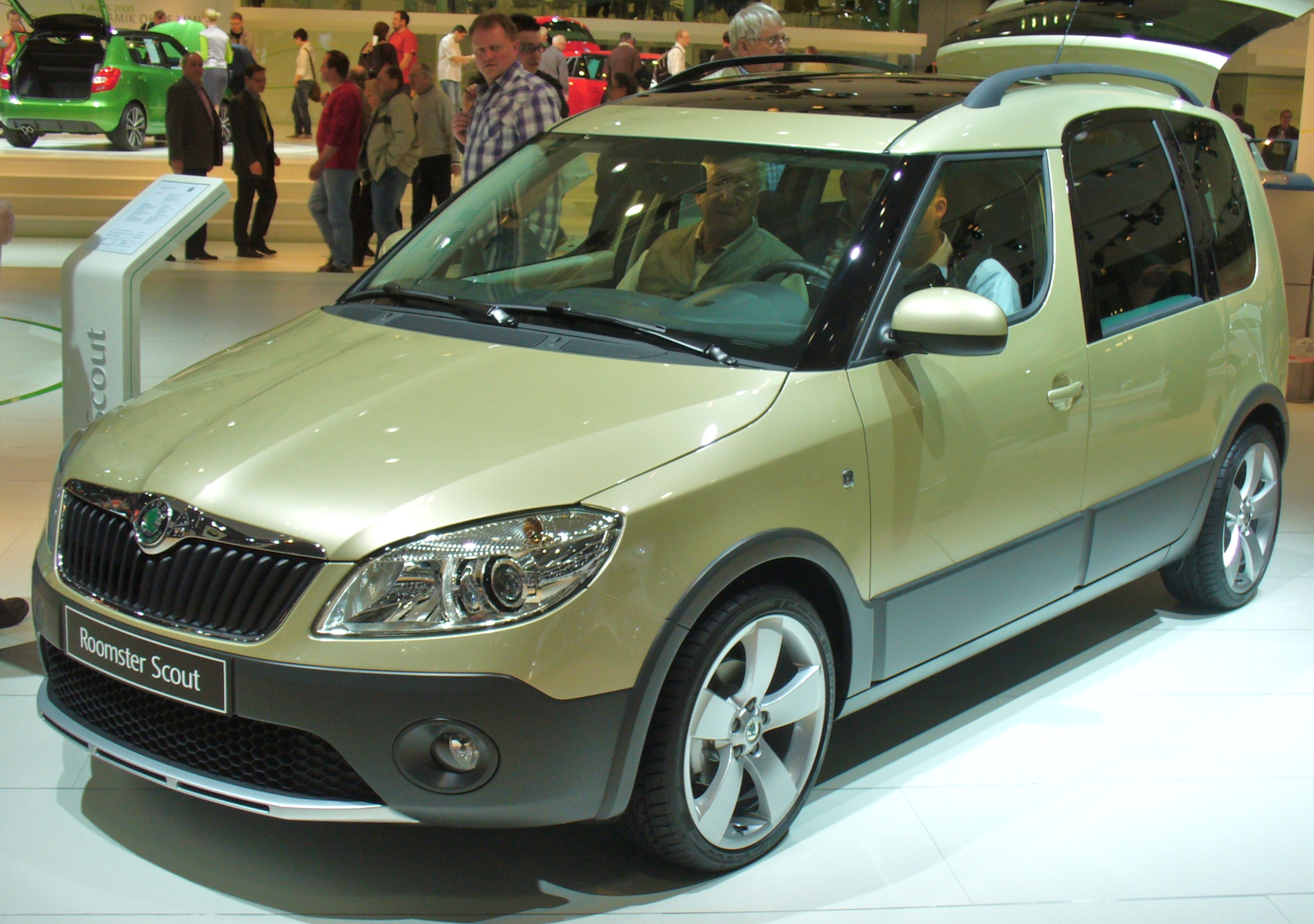
Skoda Roomster Scout Facelift

=== Related models ===
Skoda marketed from 2007 a five-door, two-seater panel van version of the Roomster called the Škoda Praktik (Typ 5J8). Its cargo space is 1,605 millimetres (63.2 in) long, 1,016 millimetres (40.0 in) wide (minimum), and 900 millimetres (35.4 in) in height – giving a cargo load space of 1,900 litres (67.1 cu ft), and a payload from 550 to 640 kilograms (1,213 to 1,411 lb). It also includes a moveable internal load bulkhead, 'hidden' underfloor storage, anti-slip load bay floor covering with six lashing points, and full length roof rails. It was never sold in RHD markets.

The model was targeted at Central and Eastern Europe. The Praktik was facelifted in 2010, as with the Roomster.

=== Engines ===
Overview of engines available for the Roomster (Typ 5J), incl. Praktik and facelifted model.

Petrol engines

Engine designation	Production	Engine code (family)	Displacement, configuration, valvetrain, fuel system, aspiration	Motive power at rpm	max. torque at rpm	Gearbox (type), drive	Top speed	0–100 km/h [s] (0–62 mph)	Combined consumption [l/100 km / mpg imp / mpg US]	CO2 [g/km]
1.2 HTP 47 kW	2006	(EA111)	1198 ccm, I3, 6V, OHC, MPI, naturally aspirated	47 kW (64 PS; 63 hp) at 5400 rpm	112 Nm. (83 lb•ft) at 3000	5-speed manual (MQ200), FWD	155 km/h (96 mph)	16.9	6.8 / 41.5 / 34.6	163
1.2 MPI 51 kW	2006–2015	(EA111)	1198 ccm, I3, 12V, DOHC, MPI, naturally aspirated	51 kW (69 PS; 68 hp) at 5400 rpm	112 Nm. (83 lb•ft) at 3000	5-speed manual (MQ200), FWD	159 km/h (99 mph)	15.9	4.7 / 60.1 / 50.0	124
1.2 TSI 63 kW	2010–2015	CBZA (EA111)	1197 ccm, I4, 8V, OHC, TSI, turbocharged	63 kW(86 PS; 85 hp) at 4800 rpm	160 Nm. (118 lb•ft) at 1500–3500 rpm	5-speed manual (MQ200), FWD	172 km/h (107 mph)	12.6	5.7 / 49.6 / 41.3	134
1.2 TSI 77 kW	2010–2015	CBZB (EA111)	1197 ccm, I4, 8V, OHC, TSI, turbocharged	77 kW (105 PS; 103 hp) at 5000 rpm	175 Nm. (129 lb•ft) at 1500–4100	5-speed manual (MQ200), FWD	184 km/h (114 mph)	10.9	5.7 / 49.6 / 41.3	134
1.2 TSI 77 kW	2010–2015	CBZB (EA111)	1197 ccm, I4, 8V, OHC, TSI, turbocharged	77 kW (105 PS; 103 hp) at 5000 rpm	175 Nm. (129 lb•ft) at 1500–4100	7-speed automatic (DQ200), FWD	184 km/h (114 mph)	11.0	5.7 / 49.6 / 41.3	134
1.4 MPI 63 kW	2006–2015	(EA111)	1390 ccm, I4, 16V, DOHC, MPI, naturally aspirated	63 kW (86 PS; 85 hp) at 5000 rpm	132 Nm. (97 lb•ft) at 3800 rpm	5-speed manual (MQ200), FWD	172 km/h (107 mph)	12.6	6.4 / 44.1 / 36.7	149
1.6 MPI 77 kW	2006–2015	(EA111)	1598 ccm, I4, 16V, DOHC, MPI, naturally aspirated	77 kW (105 PS; 103 hp) at 5600 rpm	153 Nm. (113 lb•ft) at 3800 rpm	5-speed manual (MQ200), FWD	183 km/h (114 mph)	11.3	6.9 / 40.9 / 34.1v	165
1.6 MPI 77 kW	2006–2015	(EA111)	1598 ccm, I4, 16V, DOHC, MPI, naturally aspirated	77 kW (105 PS; 103 hp) at 5600 rpm	153 Nm. (113 lb•ft) at 3800 rpm	6-speed automatic (AQ250) FWD	180 km/h (112 mph)	12.5	7.5 / 37.7 / 31.4	180

Diesel engines

Engine designation	Production	Engine code (family)	Displacement, configuration, valvetrain, fuel system, aspiration	Motive power at rpm	max. torque at rpm	Gearbox (type), drive	Top speed	0–100 km/h [s] (0–62 mph)	Combined consumption [l/100 km / mpg imp / mpg US]	CO2 [g/km]
1.2 TDI CR 55 kW	2010–2015	(EA189)	1199 ccm, I3, 12V, DOHC, common-rail, turbocharged	55 kW (75 PS; 74 hp) at 4200 rpm	180 Nm. (133 lb•ft) at 2000 rpm	5-speed manual (MQ250), FWD	162 km/h (101 mph)	15.5	4.5 / 62.8 / 52.3	119
1.2 TDI CR GL 55 kW	2010–2015	(EA189)	1199 ccm, I3, 12V, DOHC, common-rail, turbocharged	55 kW (75 PS; 74 hp) at 4200 rpm	180 Nm. (133 lb•ft) at 2000 rpm	5-speed manual (MQ250), FWD	165 km/h (103 mph)	15.4	4.2 / 67.3 / 56.0	109
1.4 TDI PD 51 kW	2006–2010	(EA188)	1422 ccm, I3, 6V, SOHC, Pumpe-Düse, turbocharged	51 kW (69 PS; 68 hp) at 4000 rpm	155 Nm. (114 lb•ft) at 1600–2800 rpm	5-speed manual (MQ250), FWD	163 km/h (101 mph)	14.8	4.8 / 58.9 / 49.0	127
1.4 TDI PD DPF 59 kW	2006–2010	(EA188)	1422 ccm, I3, 6V, SOHC, Pumpe-Düse, turbocharged	59 kW (80 PS; 79 hp) at 4000 rpm	195 Nm. (144 lb•ft) at 2200 rpm	5-speed manual (MQ250), FWD	172 km/h (107 mph)	13.3	4.8 / 58.9 / 49.0	127
1.6 TDI CR 66 kW	2010–2015	CAYB (EA189)	1598 ccm, I4, 16V, DOHC, common-rail, turbocharged	66 kW (90 PS; 89 hp) at 4200 rpm	230 Nm. (170 lb•ft) at 1500–2500 rpm	5-speed manual (MQ250), FWD	171 km/h (106 mph)	13.3	4.7 / 60.1 / 50.0	124
1.6 TDI CR 77 kW	2010–2015	CAYC (EA189)	1598 ccm, I4, 16V, DOHC, common-rail, turbocharged	77 kW (105 PS; 103 hp) at 4000 rpm	250 Nm. (184 lb•ft) at 1500–2500 rpm	5-speed manual (MQ250), FWD	181 km/h (112 mph)	11.5	4.7 / 60.1 / 50.0	124
1.9 TDI PD DPF	2006–2010	(EA188)	1896 ccm, I4, 8V SOHC, Pumpe-Düse, turbocharged	77 kW (105 PS; 103 hp) at 4000 rpm	240 Nm. (177 lb•ft) at 1900 rpm	5-speed manual (MQ250), FWD	182 km/h (113 mph)	10.8	5.0 / 56.5 / 47.0	130

=== Safety ===
ANCAP test results Skoda Roomster (2007)
Test	Score
Overall	5 /5 stars
Frontal offset	13.82/16
Side impact	16/16
Pole	2/2
Seat belt reminders	2/3
Whiplash protection	Not Assessed
Pedestrian protection	Marginal
Electronic stability control	Standard
