= Škoda Yeti =

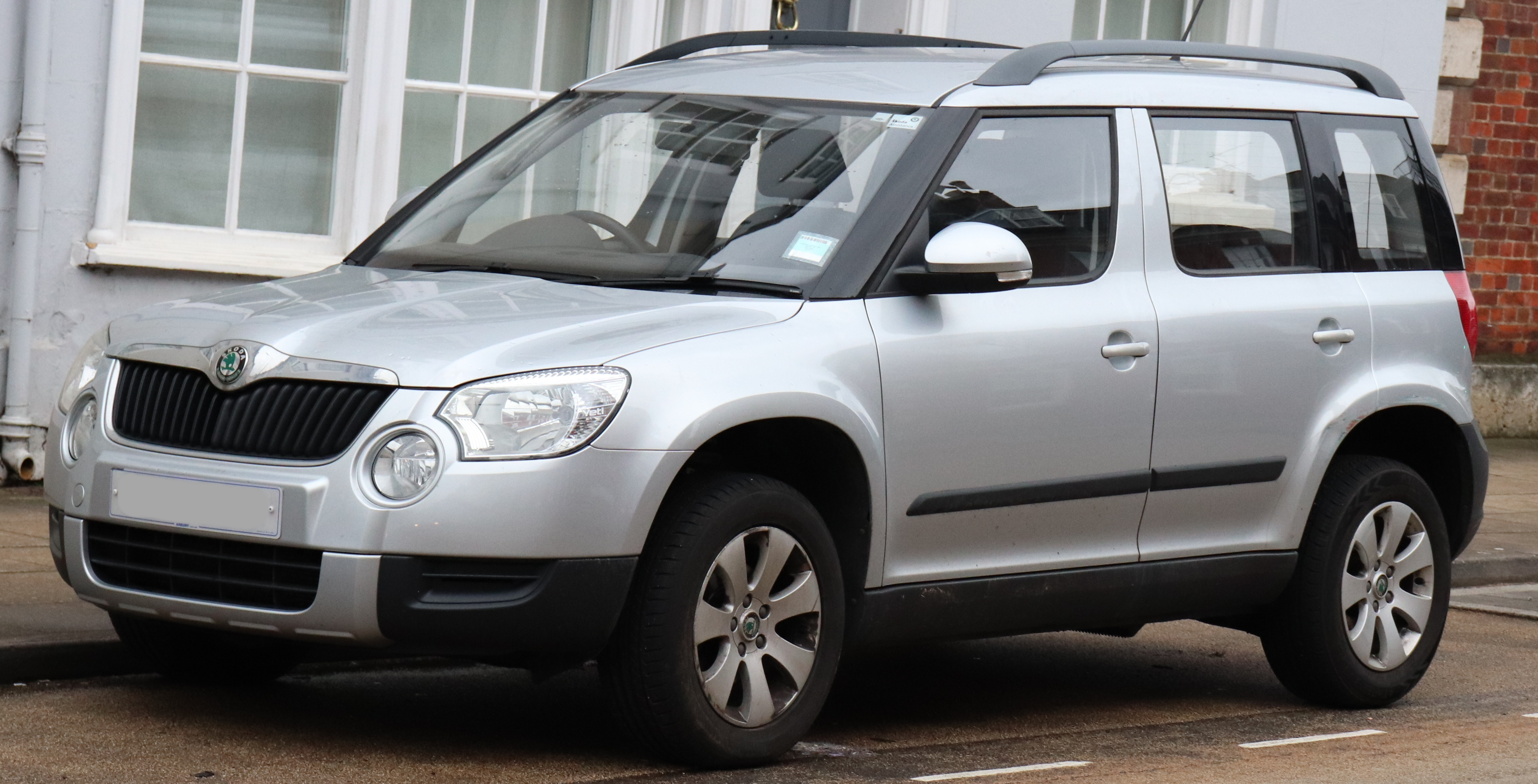

Overview
- Manufacturer: Škoda Auto
- Model code: 5L
- Production: 2009–2017
- Assembly: Czech Republic: Kvasiny; Russia: Nizhny Novgorod (GAZ); India: Aurangabad (Škoda India); China: Yizheng, Jiangsu (SAIC-VW); Kazakhstan: Oskemen (Azia Avto); Ukraine: Solomonovo (Eurocar)
- Designer: Thomas Ingenlath

Body and chassis
- Class: Compact crossover SUV
- Body style: 5-door SUV
- Layout: Front-engine, front-wheel-drive or four-wheel-drive
- Platform: Volkswagen Group A5 (PQ35)
- Related: Škoda Octavia; Volkswagen Golf V 4Motion

Powertrain
- Engine: Petrol: 1.2 L I4 TSI; 1.4 L I4 TSI; 1.6 L I4 MPI; 1.8 L I4 TSI; Diesel: 1.6 L I4 TDI; 2.0 L I4 TDI
- Transmission: 5-speed manual 6-speed manual 6-speed automatic DSG; 7-speed automatic DSG

Dimensions
- Wheelbase: 2,578 mm (101.5 in)
- Length: 4,222 mm (166.2 in)
- Width: 1,793 mm (70.6 in)
- Height: 1,691 mm (66.6 in)

Chronology
- Predecessor: Škoda Roomster
- Successor: Škoda Karoq; Škoda Kamiq

The Škoda Yeti (codenamed Typ 5L) is a compact crossover SUV produced by the Czech car manufacturer Škoda Auto and introduced at the 2009 Geneva Motor Show, as the carmaker's first entry into the SUV market. In 2009, the Yeti was awarded Family Car of the Year by Top Gear Magazine.

== Overview ==
At the Geneva Motor Show in 2005, Škoda unveiled a concept car in the compact SUV category, named the Yeti and using a single vertical windscreen wiper moving horizontally across the whole of the glass or horizontally divided hatch, the lower part of which was split into an inner and outer section so that two bicycles could be secured to the lowered outer section — features that did not see production.

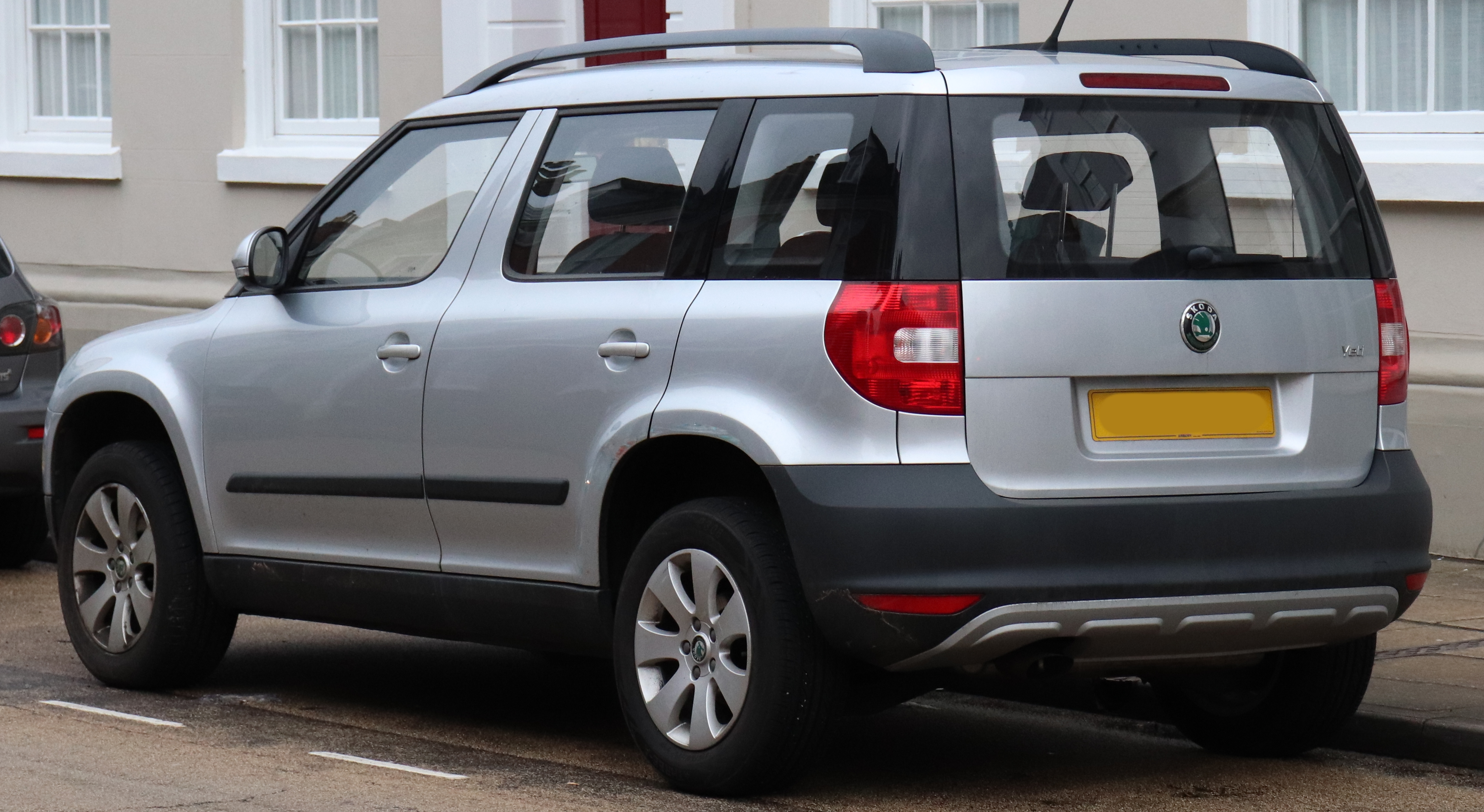
Pre-facelift Škoda Yeti (United Kingdom)

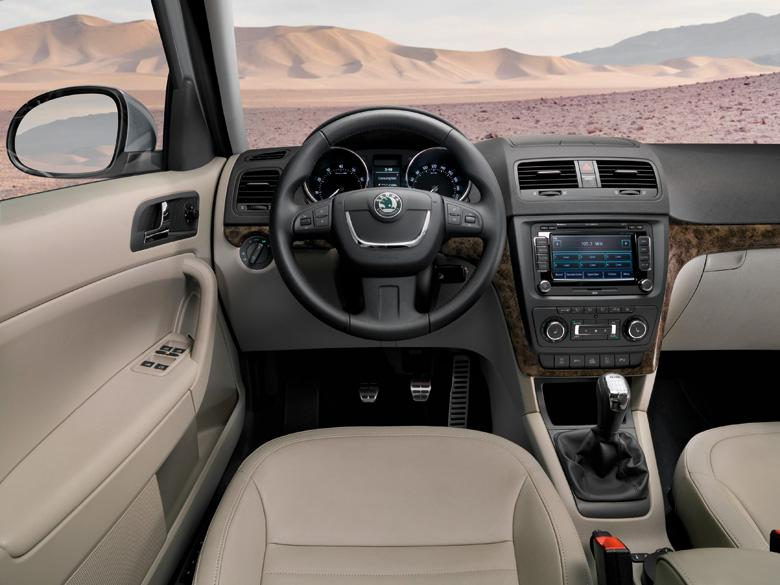
Interior

Four years later, Škoda premiered the production version of the Yeti at the 2009 Geneva Motor Show. with compact dimensions (length: 4,223 mm / 166.26 in; width: 1,793 mm / 70.60 in; wheelbase: 2,579 mm / 101.54 in), the Yeti offered an interior configuration marketed as VarioFlex with tilt, recline and tumble seating from its Škoda Roomster predecessor. There are three separate seats with adjustable backrest inclination covering a range of 13.5°.

The Yeti's outer seats can slide backwards and forwards; after the middle seat has been removed, the outer seats can be moved 80 mm (3.15 in) towards the centre, thus creating increased room for two rear passengers — with the possibility of folding the backrest and folding the entire seat forward. Once the seats have been folded over and forward, they can be removed.

Compared to the Roomster: the cushion of the middle seat has been repositioned so that it is 70 mm (2.76 in) rearward compared to the outer cushions (in the Roomster it is level); the cushion of the middle seat is approximately 35 mm longer than the cushion in the Roomster; after the middle seat is removed, the outer seats can be moved towards the centre by 80 mm (in the Roomster by 110 mm / 4.33 in).

The front passenger seat can be folded forward into a horizontal position to allow the transportation of long objects. Its luggage capacity, aided by the 'VarioFlex' rear seats, ranges from 405 litres (14.3 cu ft), up to 1,760 litres (62.2 cu ft) when the rear seats are removed.

The powertrain offerings in the Yeti included a range of internal combustion engines, all of which are four cylinder (I4) four-stroke turbocharged and EU5 emissions standard compliant. Petrol engines are all fuel injected and diesel engines are all common rail (CR) Turbocharged Direct Injection (TDI) with diesel particulate filter (DPF).

Most engines were offered with six speed manual transmissions. A five speed manual was reserved for front wheel drive only cars with the 81 kW TDI engine. The Volkswagen Group seven speed Direct-Shift Gearbox (DSG) was option exclusively for the 1.2 TSI, while the six speed Direct-Shift Gearbox (DSG) was available for the 103 kW (140 PS) two litre common rail diesel engine.

The Yeti has a 0.37 drag coefficient.

The vehicle platform is mainly inherited from the second-generation Skoda Octavia. The rear part is from the fifth-generation Volkswagen Golf 4Motion, and some parts are specific.

The four-wheel drive variants utilised the fourth generation Haldex Traction multi plate clutch to transmit the drive to the rear wheels, and all drive layouts include fully independent multi link rear suspension first seen on the Volkswagen Golf Mk5 to complement the fully independent front suspension. The all wheel drive Yeti cars featured Off Road button to switch all assistance systems to a special off-road setting, e.g. the accelerator responded less sensitively.

A set of Off-Road functions included also a hill descent control, that used sensitive braking to maintain a constant speed descending steep slopes, regardless of whether the vehicle was in any of the gears from one to three, reverse, or neutral.

The Škoda Yeti was awarded a five star safety rating by the European New Car Assessment Programme (Euro NCAP). It scored 92% for adult occupant protection in the frontal and side crash tests, 78% for child occupant protection and 46% in the pedestrian safety test.[8] It also scored 71% for default Safety Assist equipment, as the range came with driver/passenger seatbelt reminders as standard.

It also included Electronic Stability Programme (ESP) with Anti-lock Braking System (ABS), Hydraulic Brake Assist (HBA), Anti-Slip Regulation (ASR) – which is currently standard equipment on most variants throughout Europe and optional on others. Protection against whiplash injury in the rear impact (whiplash) test was also good.

The Yeti could be ordered with up to 9 airbags (dual front, front side torso, rear side torso, side curtain, and driver's knee airbag).

In most of Europe, the Yeti was available with three different trim levels: Experience, Ambition and Track (or Active in some markets). However, in the United Kingdom, it was available in five trim levels, E, S, SE, SE Plus and Elegance. In India, it was available in "Active", "Ambition" (also called "Ambiente") and "Elegance" trims.

An extensive list of standard and extras was available, incl. bi xenon headlamps with AFS, front/rear proximity sensors, automatic park assist system, tyre pressure monitoring system, navigation system with large 6.5” colour touch screen display and 30 GB hard drive, electrically adjustable seat and mirrors, rain sensor, front heated seats and a large tilt/slide two piece panoramic sunroof.

=== Safety ===
Euro NCAP test results Škoda Yeti (2009)
Test	Points	%
Overall:	5 /5 stars	
Adult occupant:	33.1	92%
Child occupant:	38.1	78%
Pedestrian:	16.7	46%
Safety assist:	5	71%

In May 2017, Škoda Australia advised that a software update had been released by VW for DSG transmissions to reduce wear in the dual clutch assemblies. This is achieved by automatically disengaging the clutch without warning when the clutch temperature reaches 200°C. This design change also introduces a variable delayed throttle response and shuddering in first gear as "normal operation".

ANCAP test results Skoda Yeti AWD diesel variants (2011)
Test	Score
Overall	5 /5 stars
Frontal offset	14.67/16
Side impact	16/16
Pole	2/2
Seat belt reminders	2/3
Whiplash protection	Not Assessed
Pedestrian protection	Marginal
Electronic stability control	Standard

=== Facelift ===
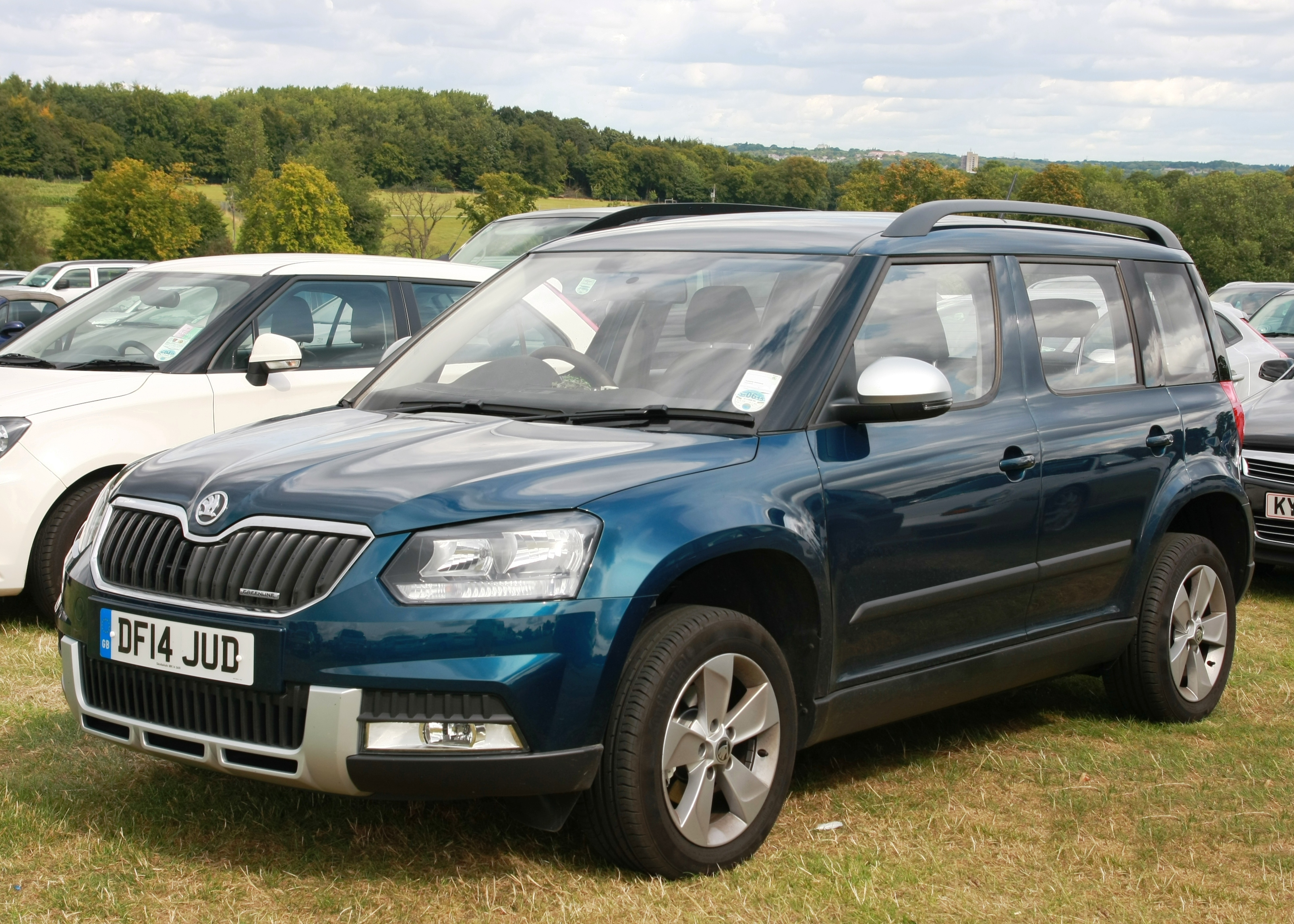
Škoda Yeti facelift

A revamped version of the Yeti had its official exhibition premiere at the Frankfurt International Motor Show in September 2013. Following the facelift, Škoda's compact SUV was available in two design versions shorter by just 1 mm in comparison to the original model: standard Yeti and rugged Yeti Outdoor.

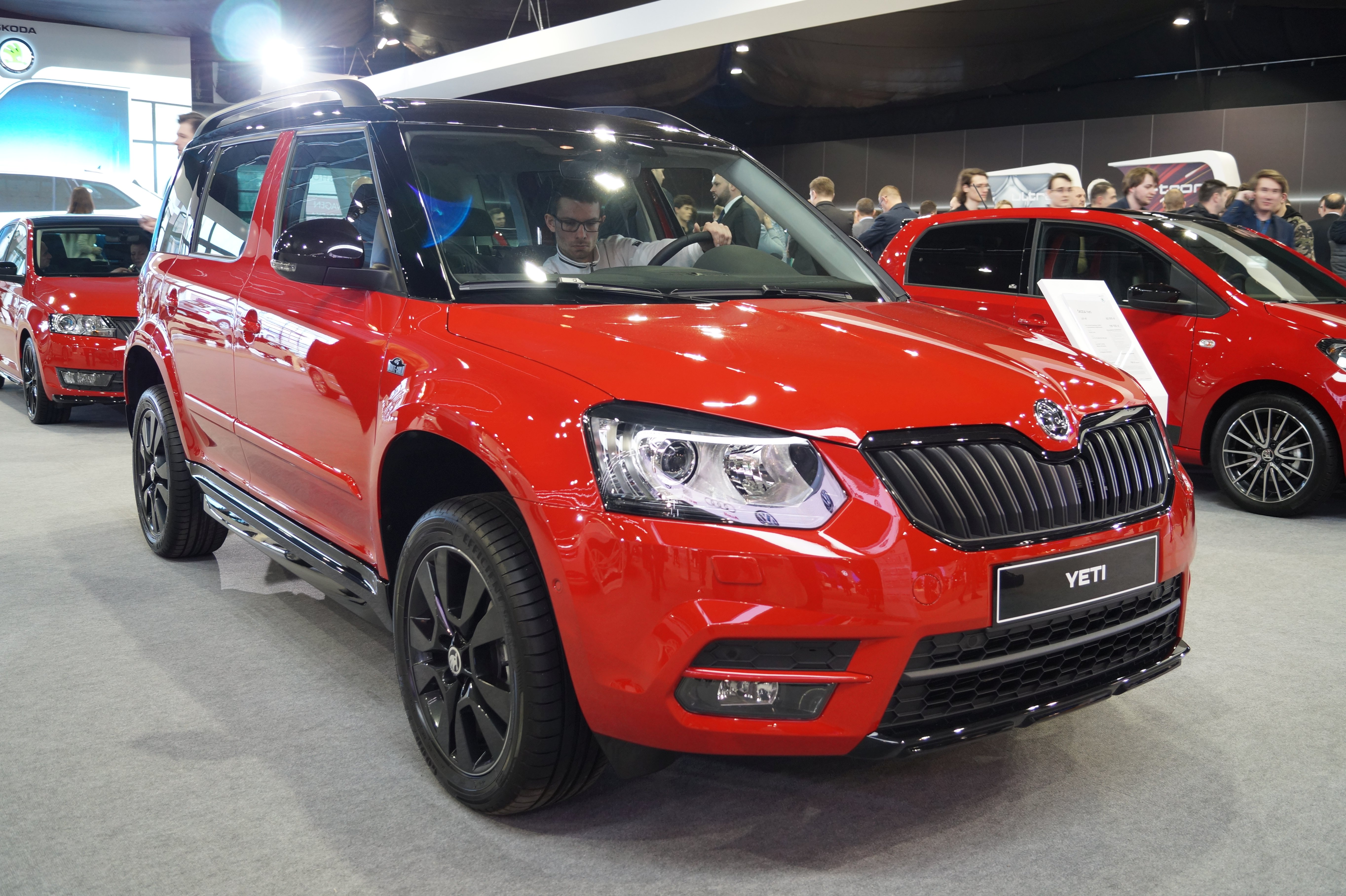
Škoda Yeti ‘Monte Carlo‘

The main difference could be found in shape of front/rear bumper; the Outdoor version had parts exposed to potential damage from terrain (lower parts of bumpers, sills) finished in black, while the ‘urban‘ Yeti has them painted in body colour. They varied also in the offer of wheel designs and upholstery. Both versions could be ordered in top of the range trim Laurin & Klement, the ‘urban‘ Yeti also in ‘Monte Carlo‘ sports design version.

The technology had also been updated. Four wheel drive was powered by the fifth generation Haldex electro hydraulically controlled multi plate coupling located at the rear axle in the same housing as the final drive and rear differential. The operating principle was much the same as the fourth generation used in the pre facelift previous model.

There had been a technical change in the way oil pressure was regulated in the clutch, i.e. FWD switching. Oil pressure on the clutch plates was, after the facelift, regulated by a centrifugal valve integrated in the electric axial six piston oil pump. Compared to the previous generation, the Haldex 5 system was 1.4 kg lighter (ca. 6.6 kg without oil) and simpler as it didn't contain an oil pressure accumulator.

The drivetrain line up featured some new combinations: seven speed DSG with the 1.6 TDI engine (currently with five speed manual for the GreenLine only), front wheel drive with the 103 kW two litre diesel and six speed manual (currently as all wheel drive only) and six speed DSG with the 125 kW two litre diesel and all-wheel drive (so far six speed manual only).

As for the equipment, the facelifted Yeti became the first Škoda car to offer rear view parking camera. It is automatically activated when reverse gear is engaged: it displays the space behind the car and indicates the driving line, based on the vehicle width. List of features was extended by – among others – keyless system for locking/unlocking doors and starting engine (KESSY), and rechargeable LED torch in boot.

Škoda unveiled Yeti Xtreme design study at the 33rd GTI Treffen.

=== China ===
A special version of the Yeti was offered in China. The car has 60 mm longer wheelbase and spare wheel can be mounted on a fifth door.

=== Engines ===
Overview of engines available for the Yeti (Typ 5L), incl. facelifted model.

Petrol engines

Engine designation	Production	Engine code (family)	Displacement, configuration, valvetrain, fuel system, aspiration	Motive power at rpm	max. torque at rpm	Gearbox (type), drive	Top speed [km/h]	Top speed [mp/h]	0–100 km/h [s] (0–62 mph)	Combined consumption [l/100 km / mpg imp / mpg US]	CO2 [g/km]
1.2 TSI 77 kW	2009–2015	CBZB (EA111)	1197 ccm, I4, 8V SOHC, turbocharged	77 kW (105 PS; 103 hp) at 5000 rpm	175 Nm. (129 lb•ft) at 1500–4100 rpm	6-speed manual (MQ200GA) FWD	175	109	11.4	6.0 / 47.8 / 39.2	140
1.2 TSI 77 kW	2010–2015	CBZB (EA111)	1197 ccm, I4, 8V SOHC, turbocharged	77 kW (105 PS; 103 hp) at 5000 rpm	175 Nm. (129 lb•ft) at 1500–4100 rpm	7-speed DSG (DQ200) FWD	173	107	11.7	6.1 / 46.3 / 38.6	142
1.2 TSI 81 kW	2015–	CYVB (EA211)	1197 ccm, I4, 16V DOHC, turbocharged	81 kW (110 PS; 108 hp) at 5000 rpm	175 Nm. (129 lb•ft) at 1400–4000 rpm	6-speed manual (MQ200GA) FWD	178	111	10.9	5.5 / 51.4 / 42.8	128
1.2 TSI 81 kW	2015–	CYVB (EA211)	1197 ccm, I4, 16V DOHC, turbocharged	81 kW (110 PS; 108 hp) at 5000 rpm	175 Nm. (129 lb•ft) at 1400–4000 rpm	7-speed DSG (DQ200) FWD	177	111	11.4	5.5 / 51.4 / 42.8	128
1.4 TSI 90 kW	2013–	CAXA (EA111)	1395 ccm, I4, 16V DOHC, turbocharged	90 kW (122 PS; 121 hp) at 5000 rpm	200 Nm. (148 lb•ft) at 1500–4000 rpm	7-speed DSG (DQ200) FWD	182	113	10.6	6.6 / 42.8 / 35.6	154
1.4 TSI 90 kW	2010–	CAXA (EA111)	1395 ccm, I4, 16V DOHC, turbocharged	90 kW (122 PS; 121 hp) at 5000 rpm	200 Nm. (148 lb•ft) at 1500–4000 rpm	6-speed manual (MQ200GA) FWD	185	115	10.6	6.4 / 44.1 / 36.7	148
1.4 TSI 92 kW	2015–	CZCA (EA211)	1395 ccm, I4, 16V DOHC, turbocharged	92 kW (125 PS; 123 hp) at 5600 rpm	200 Nm. (148 lb•ft) at 1500–4000 rpm	7-speed DSG (DQ200) FWD	187	116	10.1	5.8 / 48.7 / 40.6	134
1.4 TSI 92 kW	2015–	CZCA (EA211)	1395 ccm, I4, 16V DOHC, turbocharged	92 kW (125 PS; 123 hp) at 5600 rpm	200 Nm. (148 lb•ft) at 1500–4000 rpm	6-speed manual (MQ200GA) FWD	187	116	9.9	5.8 / 48.7 / 40.6	134
1.4 TSI 110 kW	2015–	CDGA (EA211)	1395 ccm, I4, 16V DOHC, turbocharged	110 kW (150 PS; 148 hp) at 5000 rpm	250 Nm. (184 lb•ft) at 1500–3500 rpm	6-speed manual (MQ350) AWD	195	121	8.7	6.3 / 44.8 / 37.3	147
1.4 TSI 110 kW	2015–	CDGA (EA211)	1395 ccm, I4, 16V DOHC, turbocharged	110 kW (150 PS; 148 hp) at 5000 rpm	250 Nm. (184 lb•ft) at 1500–3500 rpm	6-speed DSG (DQ250) AWD	192	119	8.9	6.4 / 44.2 / 36.8	147
1.6 MPI 81 kW	2014–	CWVA (EA211)	1598 ccm, I4, 8V SOHC, naturally aspirated	81 kW (110 PS; 107 hp) at 5800 rpm	155 Nm. (114 lb•ft) at 3800 rpm	5-speed manual (MQ200GA) FWD	175	109	11.8	6.9 / 40.9 / 34.1	160
1.6 MPI 81 kW	2014–	CWVA (EA211)	1598 ccm, I4, 8V SOHC, naturally aspirated	81 kW (110 PS; 107 hp) at 5800 rpm	155 Nm. (114 lb•ft) at 3800 rpm	6-speed automatic (AQ250) FWD	172	107	13.3	7.1 / 39.8 / 33.1	165
1.8 TSI 112 kW	2009–	CDAB (EA888)	1798 ccm, I4, 16V DOHC, turbocharged	112 kW (152 PS; 150 hp) at 4300–6200 rpm	250 Nm. (184 lb•ft) at 1500-4200 rpm	6-speed manual (MQ350) AWD	196	122	8.7	8.0 / 35.3 / 29.4	189
1.8 TSI 112 kW	2011–	CDAB (EA888)	1798 ccm, I4, 16V DOHC, TSI, turbocharged	112 kW (152 PS; 150 hp) at 4300–6200 rpm	250 Nm. (184 lb•ft) at 1500-4200 rpm	6-speed DSG (DQ250) AWD	192	119	9.0	7.9 / 35.8 / 29.8	184
1.8 TSI 118 kW	2009–	CDAA (EA888)	1798 ccm, I4, 16V DOHC, TSI, turbocharged	118 kW (160 PS; 158 hp) at 4500–6200 rpm	250 Nm. (184 lb•ft) at 1500-4500 rpm	6-speed manual (MQ350) AWD	200	124	8.4	7.8 / 36.2 / 30.2	184

Diesel engines

Engine designation	Production	Engine code (family)	Displacement, configuration, valvetrain, fuel system, aspiration	Motive power at rpm	max. torque at rpm	Gearbox (type), drive	Top speed [km/h]	Top speed [mp/h]	0–100 km/h [s] (0–62 mph)	Combined consumption [l/100 km / mpg imp / mpg US]	CO2 [g/km]
1.6 TDI CR GreenLine 77 kW	2010–2015	CAYC (EA189)	1598 ccm, I4, 16V DOHC, common-rail, turbocharged	77 kW (105 PS; 103 hp) at 4400 rpm	250 Nm. (184 lb•ft) at 1500–2500 rpm	5-speed manual (MQ250) FWD	176	109	12.1	4.6 / 61.4 / 51.1	119
1.6 TDI CR 77 kW	2013–2015	CAYC (EA189)	1598 ccm, I4, 16V DOHC, common-rail, turbocharged	77 kW (105 PS; 103 hp) at 4400 rpm	250 Nm. (184 lb•ft) at 1500–2500 rpm	6-speed DSG (DQ200) FWD	175	109	12.2	5.0 / 56.5 / 47.0	132
2.0 TDI CR 81 kW	2009–2015	CFHA (EA189)	1968 ccm, I4, 16V DOHC, common-rail, turbocharged	81 kW (110 PS; 107 hp) at 4200 rpm	250 Nm. (184 lb•ft) at 1500–2500 rpm	5-speed manual (MQ250) FWD	177	110	11.6	4.6 / 61.4 / 51.1	132
2.0 TDI CR 81 kW	2009–2015	CFHF (EA189)	1968 ccm, I4, 16V DOHC, common-rail, turbocharged	81 kW (110 PS; 107 hp) at 4200 rpm	280 Nm. (207 lb•ft) at 1750–2750 rpm	6-speed manual (MQ350) AWD	174	108	12.2	5.8 / 48.7 / 40.6	152
2.0 TDI CR 81 kW	2015–	(EA288)	1968 ccm, I4, 16V DOHC, common-rail, turbocharged	81 kW (110 PS; 107 hp) at 3500 rpm	250 Nm. (184 lb•ft) at 1750–3000 rpm	5-speed manual (MQ250) FWD	178	111	11.6		118
2.0 TDI CR 81 kW	2015–	(EA288)	1968 ccm, I4, 16V DOHC, common-rail, turbocharged	81 kW (110 PS; 107 hp) at 3500 rpm	250 Nm. (184 lb•ft) at 1750–3000 rpm	6-speed manual (MQ350) AWD	178	111	11.6		118
2.0 TDI CR 103 kW	2011–	CFHC (EA189)	1968 ccm, I4, 16V DOHC, common-rail, turbocharged	103 kW (140 PS; 138 hp) at 4200 rpm	320 Nm. (236 lb•ft) at 1750–2500	6-speed manual (MQ350) FWD	193	120	9.7	5.1 / 55.4 / 46.1	134
2.0 TDI CR 103 kW	2009–	CFHC (EA189)	1968 ccm, I4, 16V DOHC, common-rail, turbocharged	103 kW (140 PS; 138 hp) at 4200 rpm	320 Nm. (236 lb•ft) at 1750–2500	6-speed manual (MQ350) AWD	190	118	9.9	5.6 / 50.4 / 42.0	149
2.0 TDI CR 103 kW	2010–	CFHC (EA189)	1968 ccm, I4, 16V DOHC, common-rail, turbocharged	103 kW (140 PS; 138 hp) at 4200 rpm	320 Nm. (236 lb•ft) at 1750–2500	6-speed DSG (DQ250) AWD	187	116	9.9	6.3 / 44.8 / 37.3	169
2.0 TDI CR 110 kW	2015–	(EA288)	1968 ccm, I4, 16V DOHC, common-rail, turbocharged	110 kW (150 PS; 148 hp) at 3500 rpm	340 Nm. (251 lb•ft) at 1750–3000	6-speed manual (MQ350) AWD	195	121	9.1		134
2.0 TDI CR 110 kW	2015–	(EA288)	1968 ccm, I4, 16V DOHC, common-rail, turbocharged	110 kW (150 PS; 148 hp) at 3500 rpm	340 Nm. (251 lb•ft) at 1750–3000	6-speed DSG (DQ250) AWD	192	119	9.2		144
2.0 TDI CR 125 kW	2010–2015	CFJA (EA189))	1968 ccm, I4, 16V DOHC, common-rail, turbocharged	125 kW (170 PS; 168 hp) at 4200 rpm	350 Nm. (258 lb•ft) at 1750–2500	6-speed manual (MQ350) AWD	201	125	8.4	5.7 / 49.6 / 41.3	149
2.0 TDI CR 125 kW	2013–2015	CFJA (EA189)	1968 ccm, I4, 16V DOHC, common-rail, turbocharged	125 kW (170 PS; 168 hp) at 4200 rpm	350 Nm. (258 lb•ft) at 1750–2500	6-speed DSG (DQ250) AWD	196	122	8.6	6.3 / 44.8 / 37.3	164

== Concepts ==
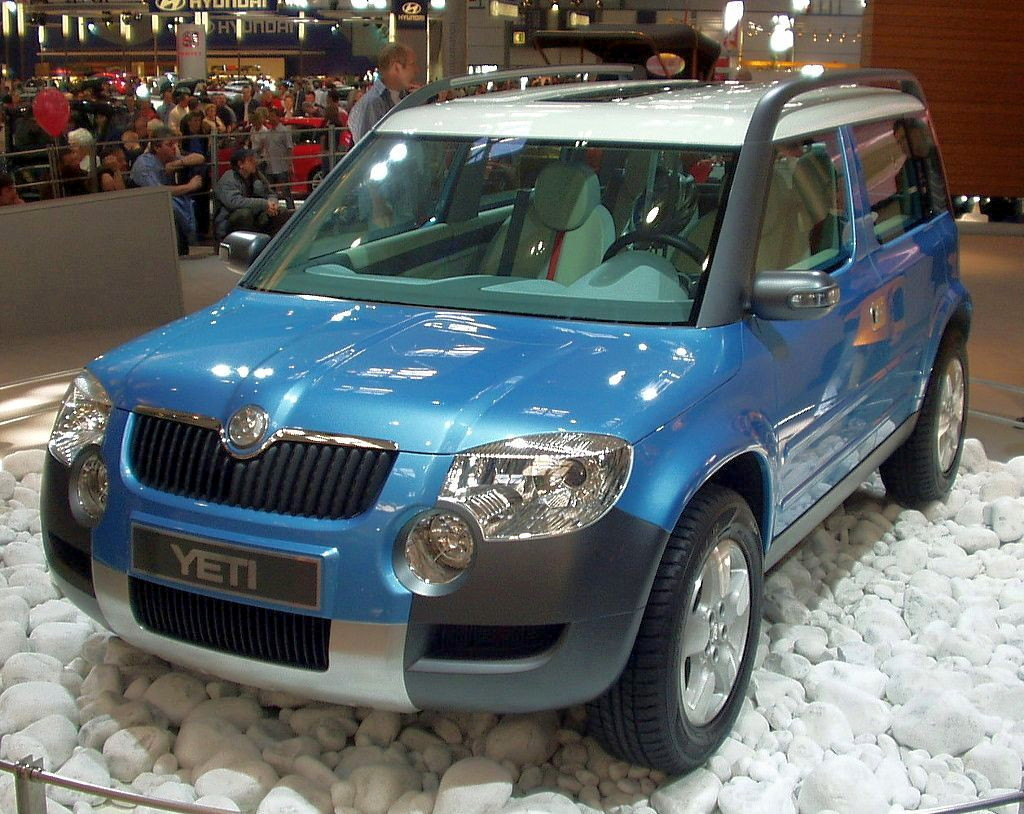
Škoda Yeti I

Škoda Auto created two concepts, the Yeti I (a blue SUV) shown at the 2005 Geneva Motor Show and the Yeti II (an orange convertible with a combination of hardtop and canvas), shown at the 2005 Frankfurt Motor Show.

In 2014, Škoda Auto presented the Yeti Xtreme at the Wörthersee annual meeting in Austria, with the concept having a matte dark gray body color with yellow elements such as the rims and roof.

In October 2022, Škoda Auto issued a press release about the Yeti, also showing its concepts. Among them is the Yeti Pickup, a never-before-seen and never-made-to-production prototype built in 2012-2013, with the rear end including the axle and suspension from the third-generation Volkswagen Caddy Max.

== Successor ==
The German magazine Auto Bild first presented a graphical rendering of the presumed new model. The news was confirmed by the Skoda chairman Bernhard Maier. It would reportedly take inspiration from the Kodiaq, being larger and more expensive than the current model, and was based on Volkswagen's MQB platform, the same as the SEAT Arona.

The successor to the Yeti was officially announced as the Karoq, and was announced publicly at the Frankfurt Motor Show in 2017. It was released in late 2017.

== Sales ==
Year	Production
2009	19,590
2010	52,632
2011	77,142
2012	90,952
2013	84,265
2014	107,084
2015	89,890
2016	95,417
2017	
