= Polestar 1 =

Plug-in hybrid sports car

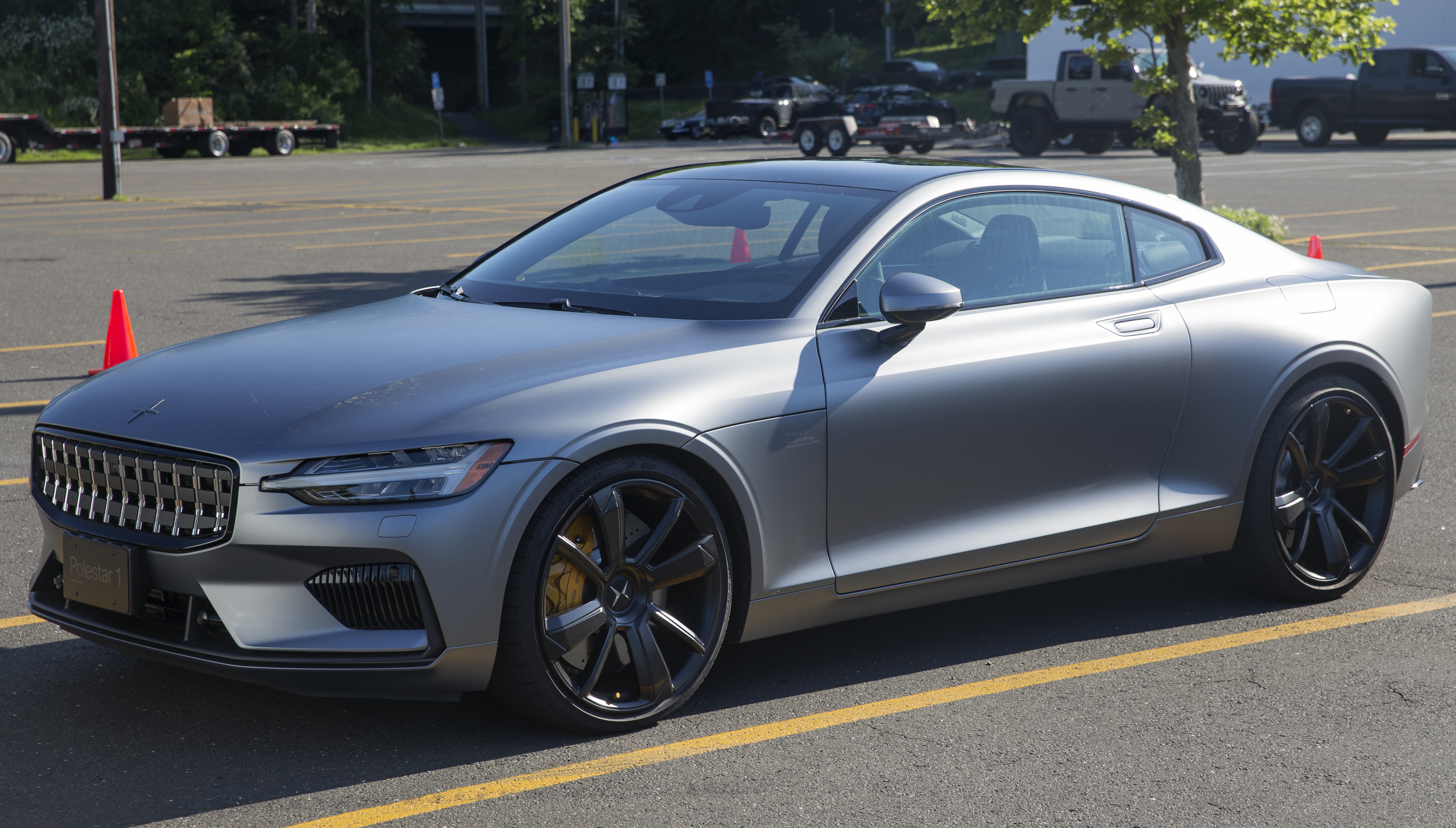

Overview
- Manufacturer: Polestar (Volvo Cars)
- Production: 2019–2022; 1,500 produced
- Assembly: China: Chengdu (Polestar Plant)
- Designer: Jürgen Jose under Thomas Ingenlath (exterior); Thomas Lienhart, Niklas Palm (interior)

Body and chassis
- Class: Grand tourer (S)
- Body style: 2-door coupe
- Layout: Front-engine, rear-motor, all-wheel drive
- Platform: Volvo SPA platform
- Related: Volvo S90/V90

Powertrain
- Engine: 2.0 L B4204T48 twincharged petrol I4
- Electric motor: 2× electric motors, rear; 1× Integrated Starter Generator (ISG), front
- Transmission: 8-speed automatic
- Hybrid drivetrain: Plug-in hybrid
- Electric range: 150 km (93 mi) (NEDC)

Dimensions
- Wheelbase: 2,742 mm (108.0 in)
- Length: 4,585 mm (180.5 in)
- Width: 1,935 mm (76.2 in)
- Height: 1,352 mm (53.2 in)
- Curb weight: 2,345 kg (5,170 lb)

Chronology
- Successor: Polestar 6

The Polestar 1 is a 2-door plug-in hybrid sports car marketed by Polestar, then a brand of Volvo Cars. It was the first car produced by the company since becoming an independent car manufacturer in June 2017. Based on Volvo's Concept Coupé from 2013, the Polestar 1 is built on the Volvo Scalable Product Architecture platform and is powered by a hybrid powertrain, using a front-mounted engine and two electric motors at the rear. A limited production run of 1,500 cars took place over three years, from 2019 to 2022, for the left-hand drive market only. For an original MSRP of $156,500. Production took place in Chengdu, China, where the company's first production facility was built.

== History ==
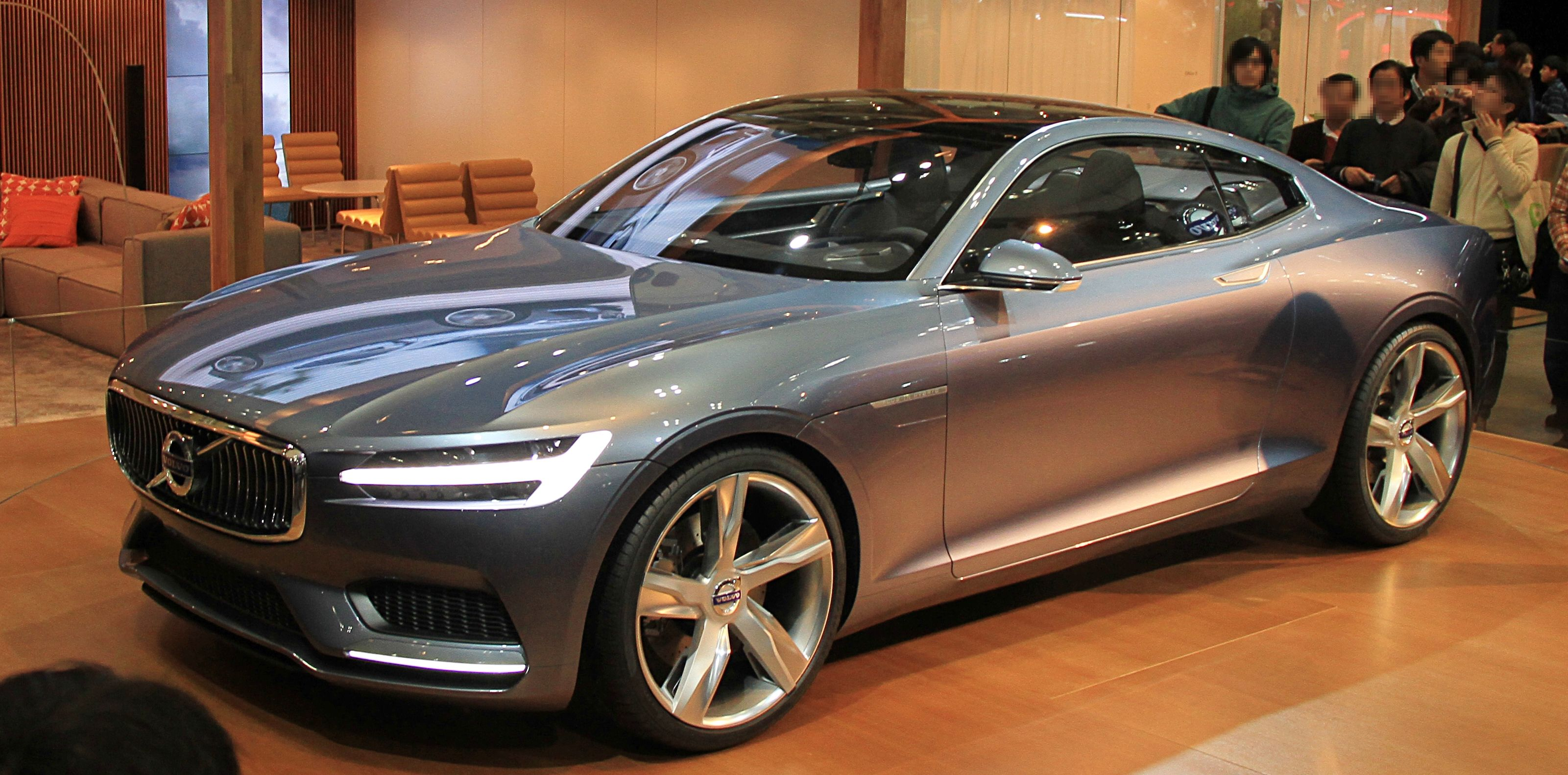
2013 Volvo Concept Coupé

The Polestar 1 started as Volvo's Concept Coupé from 2013, styled by German car designer Thomas Ingenlath, who previously worked in lead design positions at Audi, Volkswagen and Škoda. After the unveiling of the Concept Coupé, Ingenlath said that the model took inspiration from the Volvo P1800, stating that "it is a car designer’s duty to reflect and incorporate design signatures that are vital parts of the company’s heritage".

The Polestar 1 was unveiled on October 17, 2017, at the Shanghai Auto Show, making its world premiere and first public appearance. It came after several teasers were released from the company, including a video revealing the car's reveal date while several detail photographs were posted by the company's Instagram account from October 2 to 16, 2017.

In June 2019, Polestar announced that the Polestar 1 was entering its final stages of development as a prototype, before production would officially commence in the later-unveiled production site in Chengdu, China.

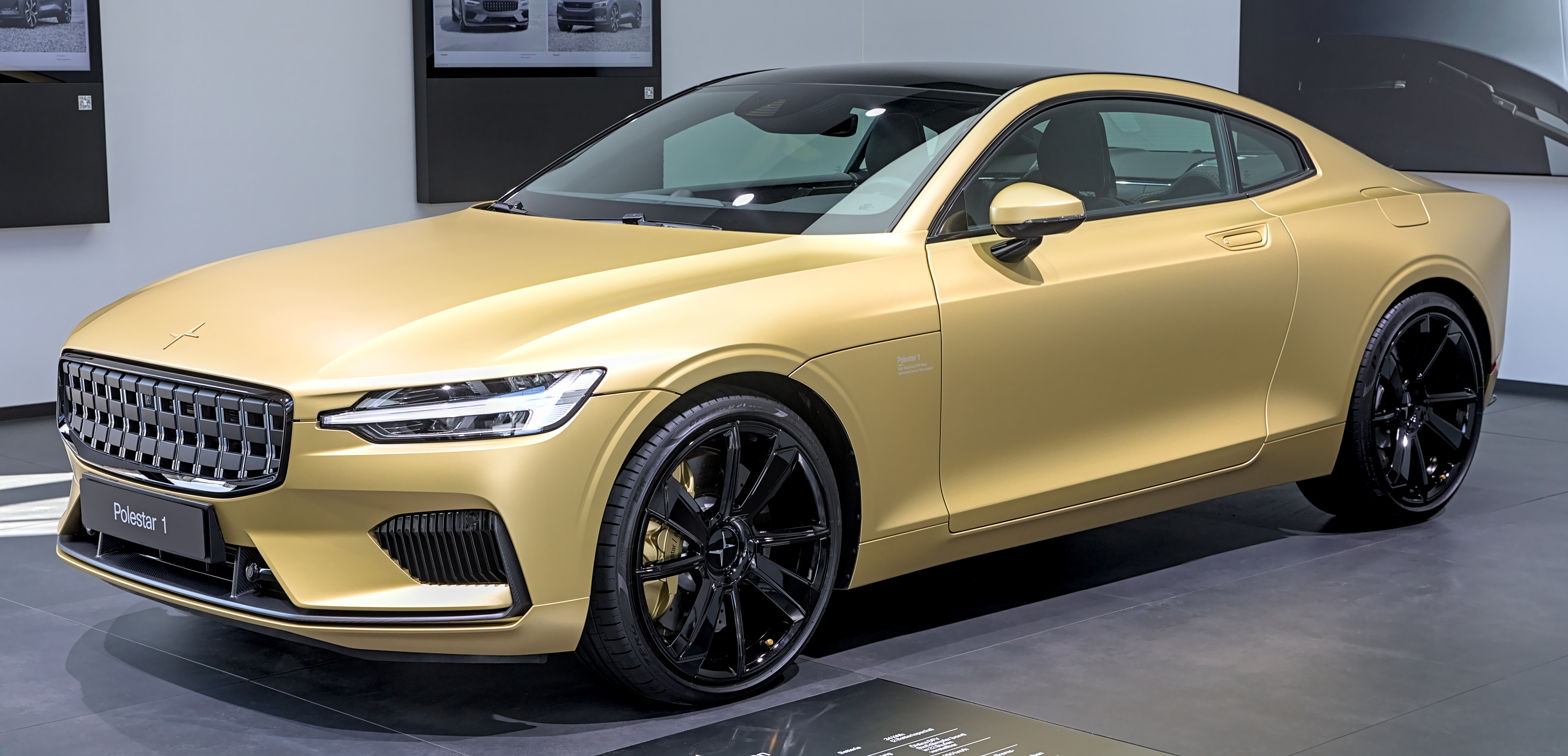
Only 25 matte-gold Polestar 1 were made to commemorate the final run of production.

In April 2021, the final version of the Polestar 1 was unveiled at the 2021 Shanghai Auto Show. This matte-gold Polestar 1 was designed to commemorate the final run of production and featured no difference to the original car other than the paint. Only 25 were made, with a USD$5,000 price increase over the base MSRP.

The production of the Polestar 1 officially ended later in 2022.

== Technical details ==
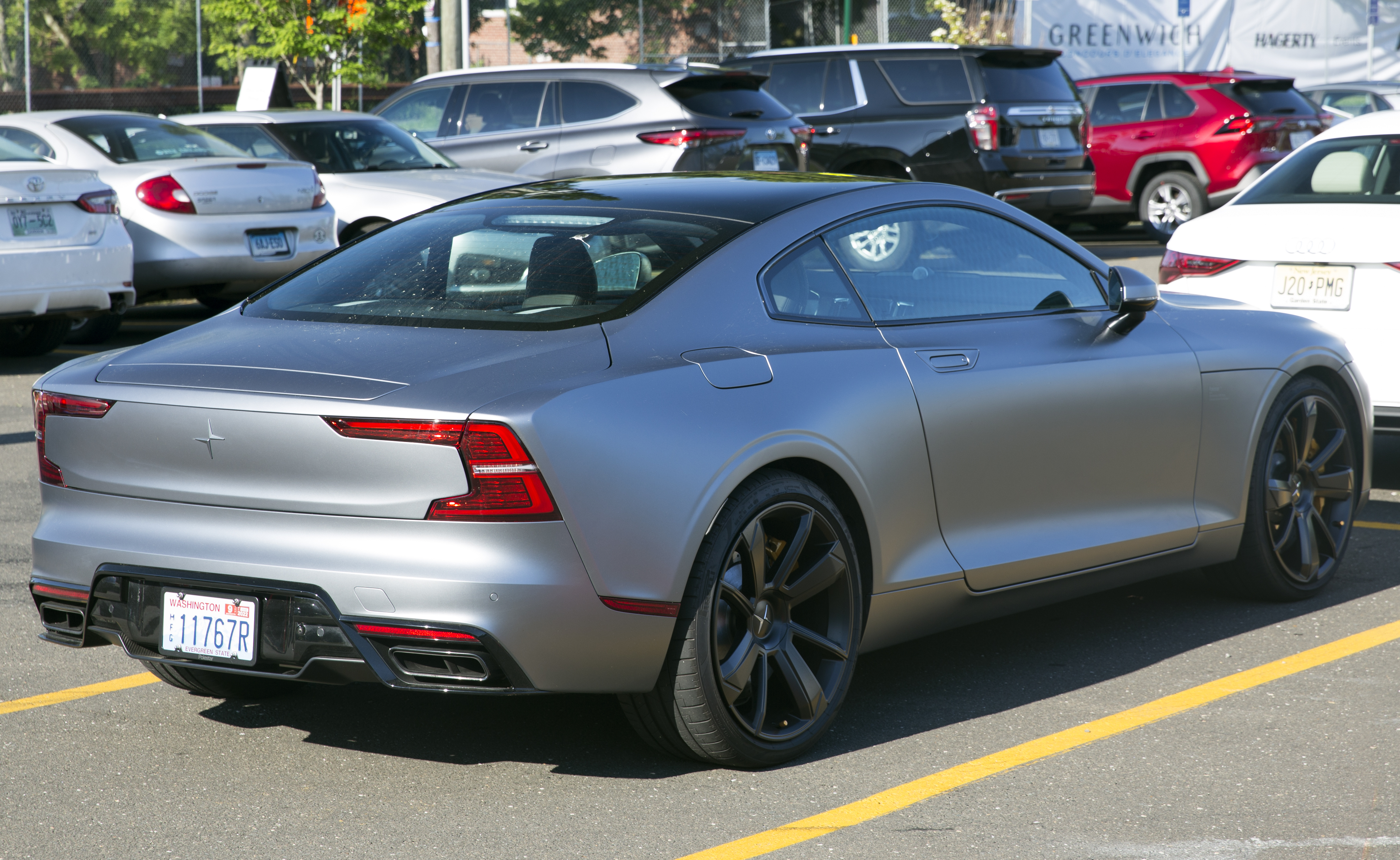
Rear

=== Performance ===
Polestar claim the sprint of 0–100 km/h (0–62 mph) can take 4.2 seconds.

=== Powertrain ===
The Polestar 1 is powered by a hybrid powertrain, using a twincharged 2.0-litre inline four-cylinder petrol (gasoline) engine from the Volvo XC90 T8 to drive the front wheels through an 8-speed automatic transmission, with an additional two electric motors powering the rear wheels. Combined, the total output is 619 hp (462 kW; 628 PS) and 738 lb⋅ft (1,001 N⋅m). At its announcement, the maximum power output was rated slightly less, at 600 hp (450 kW; 610 PS).

The petrol engine is connected to an Integrated Starter Generator, acting as a starter motor and torque fill during gear changes. It adds 68 hp (51 kW; 69 PS), for a total output of 326 hp (243 kW; 331 PS) and 321 lb⋅ft (435 N⋅m) to the front axle.

Each electric motor produces 116 hp (87 kW; 118 PS), for a total of 232 hp (173 kW; 235 PS) and 354 lb⋅ft (480 N⋅m) to the rear axle.

Motors
Power Type	Type	Power	Torque	Additional information
Petrol (gasoline)	2.0 litre supercharged and turbocharged in-line four-cylinder	328 hp (245 kW; 333 PS)	370 N⋅m (273 lb⋅ft)	Power sent to front wheels
Electric	2 x electric motor	232 hp (173 kW; 235 PS)	480 N⋅m (354 lb⋅ft)	Power sent to rear wheels
Electric	Integrated starter generator (ISG)	68 hp (51 kW; 69 PS)	150 N⋅m (111 lb⋅ft)	-
Electric & petrol (gasoline)	All motors combined	600 hp (447 kW; 608 PS)	1,000 N⋅m (738 lb⋅ft)	-

=== Batteries ===
The Polestar 1 has a total capacity of 34 kWh arranged in three battery stacks (two packs), fitted behind the rear seats and along the central tunnel. This gives the Polestar 1 an all-electric range of 150 km (93 mi) on the NEDC. Polestar claimed that this was the largest electric range for any plug-in hybrid available at the time.

Under the U.S. EPA driving cycle, the Polestar 1 has an all-electric range of 52 mi (84 km) and an equivalent fuel consumption of 58 mpg‑e (58 kW⋅h/100 mi). On gasoline alone, the Polestar 1 is rated at 26 mpg_{‑US} (9.0 L/100 km; 31 mpg_{‑imp}) for combined city/highway driving, giving an estimated range of 417 mi (671 km).

=== Power distribution ===
The Polestar 1 has a plug-in hybrid powertrain, the supercharged and turbocharged high-performance petrol in-line four-cylinder petrol engine drives the front wheels. Two electric motors drive the rear wheels. In addition to these electric motors the Polestar 1 is equipped with an Integrated Starter Generator (ISG). Combined with the electric motors are planetary gear sets. These planetary gear sets enable torque vectoring, a technology used in racing to bring both acceleration and stability through curves.

=== Suspension and chassis ===
The Polestar 1 is based on the Volvo Scalable Product Architecture platform (SPA). Compared to the S90, which shares the SPA platform with the Polestar 1, the wheelbase was shortened by 7.9 in (200 mm) and approximately 7 in (180 mm) were removed from the rear overhang.

It has double wishbone front suspension, connecting each wheel with two transverse links. This design enables the front suspension to counteract torque steer. Most suspension parts are made of aluminium. The rear suspension is an integral link design, with a transverse composite leaf spring. Polestar 1 is the first car with Öhlins Continuously Controlled Electronic Suspension (CESi). The CESi can be set to adapt instantly to road conditions and in accordance with the driver’s chosen setting.

The front brakes are specified by Polestar and manufactured by Akebono, six piston aluminium Mono block calipers on each front wheel are milled from one-piece. The calipers are coupled with 400x38mm ventilated and drilled discs.

== Design ==
=== Exterior ===
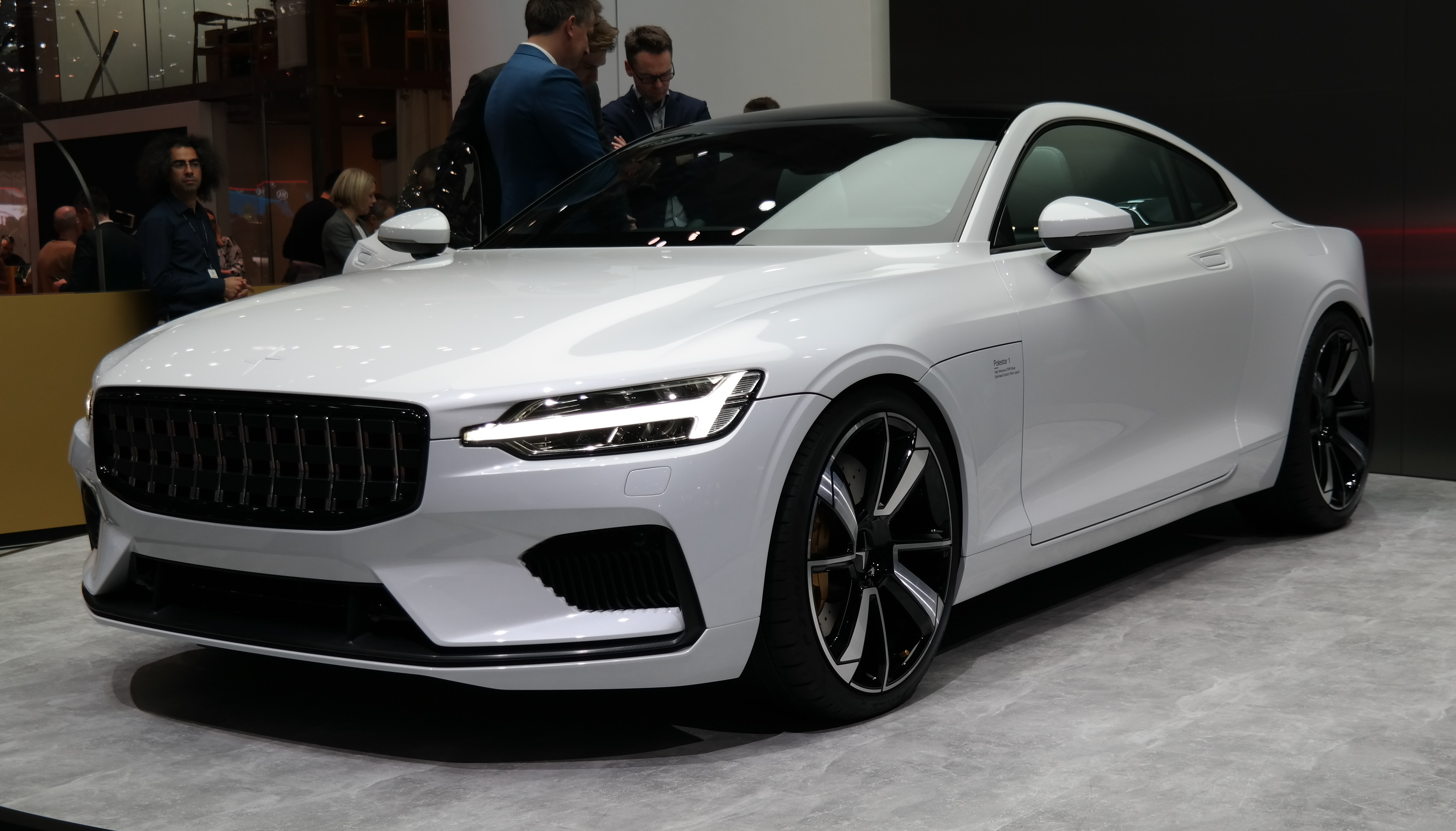
A Polestar 1 at the 2018 Geneva Motor Show

Practically all exterior panels of the Polestar 1 upper body, including doors, bonnet and boot-lid, are made of carbon fibre reinforced polymer (CFRP) for maximum stiffness, torsional rigidity and lightness. Polestar claim that using steel panels would have increased the car's weight by 500 lb (230 kg).

The Polestar 1 has a standard-fitted active rear spoiler delivering high-speed downforce on the rear axle. It automatically raises from its integrated flush position when the speed exceeds 100 km/h (62 mph) and is retracted when the speed is reduced below 70 km/h (43 mph).

Polestar 1 comes with a fixed panoramic glass roof, stretching all the way from the top of the windscreen to the upper edge of the rear window.

The tyre sizes are 275/30 R21 for the front and 295/30 R21 for the rear. The Polestar 1 was available in six colors: Space, Snow, Midnight, Osmium, Osmium Grey, and Magnesium, with two options for the interior: Charcoal with Zinc for the seats or full Charcoal. Three options were available for the rims: Diamond Cut, Glossy Black, and Matte Black.

The exterior styling of the Polestar 1 (and the Volvo Concept Coupé that preceded it) was later used in the design of the current-generation Volvo S60.

=== Interior ===
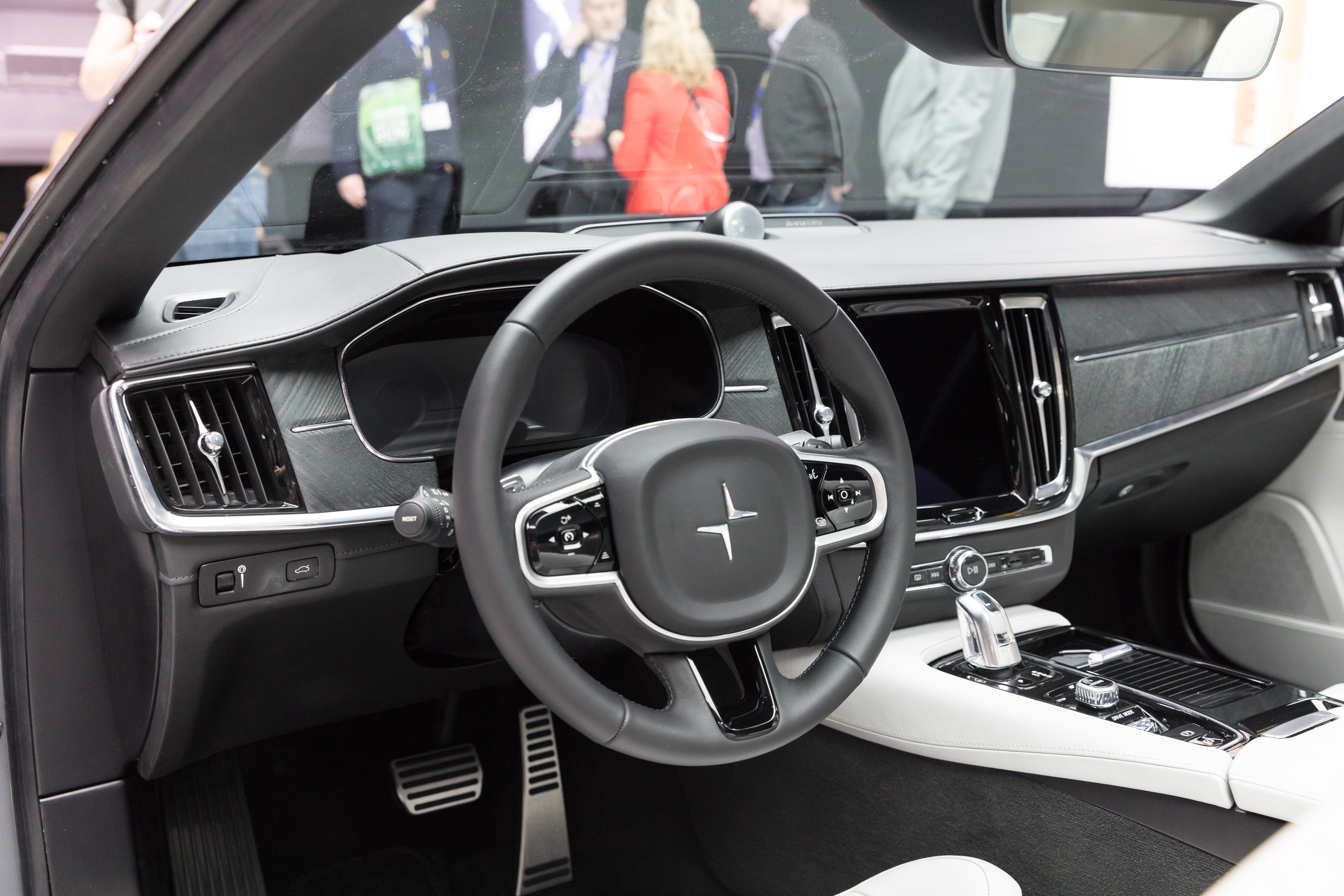
Interior

The interior features handcrafted leather detailing and a carbon fibre wing that stretches to the full height of the instrument panel. The Polestar 1 also comes with a Bowers & Wilkins high-end sound system.

The trunk can accommodate 4.3 cu ft (0.12 m^{3}) of cargo, as most of the space is occupied by the high-voltage traction battery.
