= Twincharger =

Forced induction system that uses both a Supercharger and a Turbocharger

A twincharger refers to a compound forced induction system used on some internal combustion engines. It is a combination of an exhaust-driven turbocharger and a mechanically driven supercharger, each mitigating the weaknesses of the other.

Twincharging does not refer to a twin-turbo arrangement, but to a setup where two different types of compressors are used (instead of only turbochargers or superchargers).

== Overview and advantages ==
A mechanically driven supercharger offers exceptional response and low-rpm performance, as it does not rely on pressurization of the exhaust manifold (assuming that it is a positive-displacement design, such as a Roots-type or twin-screw, as opposed to a centrifugal supercharger, which does not provide substantial boost in the lower rpm range), but is less efficient than a turbocharger due to increased parasitic load. A turbocharger sized to move a large volume of air tends to respond slowly to throttle input, while a smaller, more responsive turbocharger may fail to deliver sufficient boost pressure through an engine's upper rpm range.

The lag time in a large turbocharger is effectively neutralized when combined with a supercharger, which tends to generate substantial boost pressure much faster in response to throttle input, the end result being a lag-free power band with high torque at lower engine speeds and increased power at the upper end. Twincharging is therefore desirable for small-displacement motors (such as VW's 1.4TSI), especially those with a large operating rpm range, since they can take advantage of an artificially broad torque band over a large speed range.

== Types ==
A twincharging system combines a supercharger and turbocharger in a complementary arrangement, with the intent of one compressor's advantage compensating for the other's disadvantage. There are two common types of twincharger systems: series and parallel.

=== Series ===
The series arrangement, the more common arrangement of twinchargers, is set up such that one compressor's output feeds the inlet of another. A supercharger is connected to a medium- to large-sized turbocharger. The supercharger provides near-instant manifold pressure (eliminating turbo lag, which would otherwise result when the turbocharger is not up to its operating speed). Once the turbocharger has reached operating speed, the supercharger can either continue compounding the pressurized air to the turbocharger inlet (yielding elevated intake pressures), or it can be bypassed and/or mechanically decoupled from the drivetrain via an electromagnetic clutch and bypass valve, increasing induction efficiency.

Other series configurations exist where no bypass system is employed and both compressors are in continuous use. As a result, compounded boost is always produced as the pressure ratios of the two compressors are multiplied, not added. In other words, if a turbocharger which produces 10 psi (0.7 bar) on its own feeds into a supercharger which produces 10 psi on its own, the resultant manifold pressure would be 27 psi (1.9 bar) rather than 20 psi (1.4 bar). This form of series twincharging allows for the production of boost pressures that would otherwise be inefficient or unachievable with other compressor arrangements.

However, turbo and supercharger efficiencies do not multiply. For example, if a turbocharger with an efficiency of 70% feeds into a Roots supercharger with an efficiency of 60%, the total compression efficiency would be somewhere in between. To calculate this efficiency, it is necessary to calculate the efficiencies of the 2 stages, first calculating the conditions of pressure and temperature at the exit of the first stage and starting from these to calculate for the second stage. Following the previous example, for a first stage of the turbocharger with an efficiency of 70%, the temperature would reach 88.5 °C (191.3 °F) after the first stage, to then enter the supercharger with an efficiency of 60% and leave at a temperature of 186.5 °C (367.7 °F), resulting in a total efficiency of 62%. A large turbocharger that produces 27 psi (1.9 bar) by itself, with a thermal efficiency of around 70%, would produce air only 166 °C (331 °F) in temperature. In addition, the cost of energy to compress air with a supercharger is higher than that of a turbocharger; if the supercharger is not compressing air, there remains only a small parasitic loss of rotating the working parts of the supercharger. This remaining loss can be eliminated by disconnecting the supercharger further using an electromagnetic clutch (such as those used in the VW 1.4TSI or Toyota 4A-GZE to bypass the supercharger in low-load conditions).

With series twincharging, the turbocharger can be of a less expensive and more durable journal bearing variety, and the sacrifice in boost response is more than made up for by the instant-on nature of positive-displacement superchargers. While the weight and cost of the supercharger assembly are always a factor, the inefficiency of the supercharger is minimized once the turbocharger reaches operating speed and the supercharger is effectively disconnected by the bypass valve.

=== Parallel ===
Parallel arrangements typically require the use of a bypass or diverter valve to allow one or both compressors to feed the engine optimally. If no valve was used and both compressors were merely routed directly to the intake manifold, the supercharger would blow backwards through the turbocharger compressor rather than pressurize the intake manifold, as that would be the path of least resistance. Thus, a diverter valve must be employed to vent turbocharger air until the appropriate intake manifold pressure has been reached.

== Disadvantages ==
The main disadvantage of twincharging is the complexity and expense of components. Usually, to provide acceptable response, smoothness of power delivery, and adequate power gain over a single-compressor system, expensive electronic and/or mechanical controls must be used. In a spark-ignition engine, a low compression ratio must also be used if the supercharger produces high boost levels, negating some of the efficiency benefits of a lower-displacement engine.

== Applications ==
The concept of twincharging was first used by Lancia in 1985 in its Lancia Delta S4 Group B rally car and its street-legal counterpart, the Delta S4 Stradale. The idea was also successfully adapted to production road cars by Nissan with their March Super Turbo. Additionally, multiple companies have produced aftermarket twincharger kits for cars like the Subaru Impreza WRX, Mini Cooper S, Ford Mustang, and Toyota MR2.

Nissan produced versions of K10 generation (March) Micra equipped with twincharged MA09ERT engine, such as the Micra Superturbo, Micra R & Micra Superturbo R. .

Power	Torque	Vehicles
81 kW (110 PS; 108 bhp) at 6500 rpm	130 N⋅m (96 lb⋅ft) at 5200 rpm	(March) Micra Superturbo

The Volkswagen 1.4 TSI is a 1400 cc engine – utilised by numerous automobiles of the VW Group – that sees use of both a turbocharger and a supercharger, and is available with eight power ratings:

Power	Torque	Vehicles
103 kW (140 PS; 138 bhp) at 5,600 rpm	220 N⋅m (162 lbf⋅ft) at 1,500–4,000 rpm	VW Golf V, VW Jetta V, and VW Touran
110 kW (150 PS; 148 bhp) at 5,800 rpm	220 N⋅m (162 lbf⋅ft) at 1,250–4,500 rpm	SEAT Ibiza IV
110 kW (150 PS; 148 bhp) at 5,800 rpm	240 N⋅m (177 lbf⋅ft) at 1,500–4,000 rpm	(CNG version) VW Passat VI, VW Passat VII, VW Touran
110 kW (150 PS; 148 bhp) at 5,800 rpm	240 N⋅m (177 lbf⋅ft) at 1,750–4,000 rpm	VW Sharan II, VW Tiguan, SEAT Alhambra
118 kW (160 PS; 158 bhp) at 5,800 rpm	240 N⋅m (177 lbf⋅ft) at 1,500–4,500 rpm	VW Eos, VW Golf VI, VW Jetta VI, VW Scirocco III
125 kW (170 PS; 168 bhp) at 6,000 rpm	240 N⋅m (177 lbf⋅ft) at 1,500–4,500 rpm	VW Golf V, VW Jetta V, VW Touran
132 kW (179 PS; 177 bhp) at 6,200 rpm	250 N⋅m (184 lbf⋅ft) at 2,000–4,500 rpm	VW Polo V, SEAT Ibiza Cupra, Škoda Fabia II
136 kW (185 PS; 182 bhp) at 6,200 rpm	250 N⋅m (184 lbf⋅ft) at 2,000–4,500 rpm	Audi A1

Volvo produces a twincharged 1969 cc inline-four engine that is utilised in their T6, T8, and Polestar models. The T8 adds onto the T6 with a rear electric motor.

Power	Torque	Vehicles
235 kW (320 PS; 316 bhp) at 5,700 rpm	400 N⋅m (295 lbf⋅ft) at 2,200–5,400 rpm	Volvo S60 T6, Volvo V60 T6, Volvo S90 T6, Volvo XC60 T6, Volvo XC90 T6
270 kW (367 PS; 362 bhp) at 6,000 rpm	470 N⋅m (347 lbf⋅ft) at 3,100–5,100 rpm	Volvo S60 Polestar, Volvo V60 Polestar, Volvo XC60 Polestar
300 kW (408 PS; 402 bhp)	640 N⋅m (472 lbf⋅ft)	Volvo S60 T8, Volvo V60 T8, Volvo S90 T8, Volvo XC60 T8, Volvo XC90 T8 (with rear electric motor)
450 kW (612 PS; 603 bhp)	1,000 N⋅m (738 lbf⋅ft)	Polestar 1(with two rear electric motors)

Jaguar Land Rover produces a twincharged 3.0-litre inline-six engine.

Power	Torque	Vehicles
340 PS (250 kW; 335 bhp)	495 N⋅m (354 lb⋅ft)	P340
400 PS (294 kW; 395 bhp)	550 N⋅m (406 lb⋅ft)	P400

The Danish Zenvo ST1 supercar makes use of both turbocharging and supercharging in its 7.0-litre V8 engine.

Power	Torque	Vehicles
1,104 hp (823 kW; 1,119 PS) at 6,900 rpm	1,430 N⋅m (1,055 lbf⋅ft) at 4,500 rpm	ST1

== Alternative systems ==
=== Anti-lag system ===
Anti-lag systems work in one of two ways: by running a very rich air–fuel ratio and pumping air into the exhaust to ignite unburnt fuel in the exhaust manifold, or by severely retarding ignition timing to cause combustion to continue well after the exhaust valve has opened. Both methods involve combustion in the exhaust manifold to keep the turbocharger spinning, and the heat from this will shorten the life of the turbine greatly. Therefore, in spite of twincharging's complexity, its largest benefit over anti-lag systems in race cars is reliability.

=== Variable geometry turbocharger ===
A variable-geometry turbocharger provides an improved response at varying engine speeds. With an electronically controlled variable angle of incidence, it is possible to have the turbine reach a good operating speed quickly or at lower engine speeds without severely diminishing its utility at higher engine speeds.

=== Twin-scroll turbocharger ===
A twin-scroll turbocharger design uses two separate chambers to better harness energy from alternating exhaust gas pulses. The chambers' nozzles may also be of different sizes, to better balance low-rpm response and high-rpm output.

=== Sequential twin turbochargers ===
Sequential turbocharger systems use differently-sized turbochargers to decrease turbo lag without compromising ultimate boost output and engine power.

=== Nitrous oxide ===
Nitrous oxide (N_{2}O) is mixed with incoming air, serving as an oxidizing agent to burn more fuel for supplemental power when a turbocharger is not spinning quickly. This also produces more exhaust gases so that the turbocharger reaches operating speed faster, providing more oxygen for combustion, and the N_{2}O flow is reduced accordingly. The expense of both the system itself and the consumable N_{2}O can be significant.

=== Water injection ===
For increased engine power, and to augment other benefits of forced induction, an aftermarket water injection system can be added to the induction system of both gasoline and diesel internal combustion engines.
