= Thomas Ingenlath =

German car designer

Thomas Ingenlath is a German car designer and the Chief Design Officer at Volvo Cars. He previously served as Senior Vice President Design at the same company, before becoming the first CEO of Polestar.

== Education and career ==
Ingenlath obtained an MA in Vehicle Design at the Royal College of Art in London following his degree at Fachhochschule für Gestaltung in Pforzheim, Germany. He joined the Volkswagen Group and worked for Audi, chief exterior designer for Volkswagen and then in 2000 was appointed Chief Designer at Škoda. In 2006 he was promoted to Director of Design at the Volkswagen Design Center in Potsdam.

In 2012 he moved to Volvo as head of design and in 2017 became CEO of the Polestar subsidiary. He resigned on 27 August 2024 to be replaced by Michael Lohscheller. In July 2025, Ingenlath was appointed senior design adviser to Geely Group in their Gothenburg, Sweden offices. In January 2026, Volvo Cars announced his comeback as CDO.

== Notable designs ==
- Škoda Ahoj
- Škoda Superb
- Škoda Fabia
- Škoda Roomster
- Škoda Yeti
- Polestar 1
- Polestar 2
- Volkswagen XL1
- Volvo XC90 II
- Volvo S90/V90
- Volvo XC40
