= Android Automotive =

Android operating system version for car infotainment systems

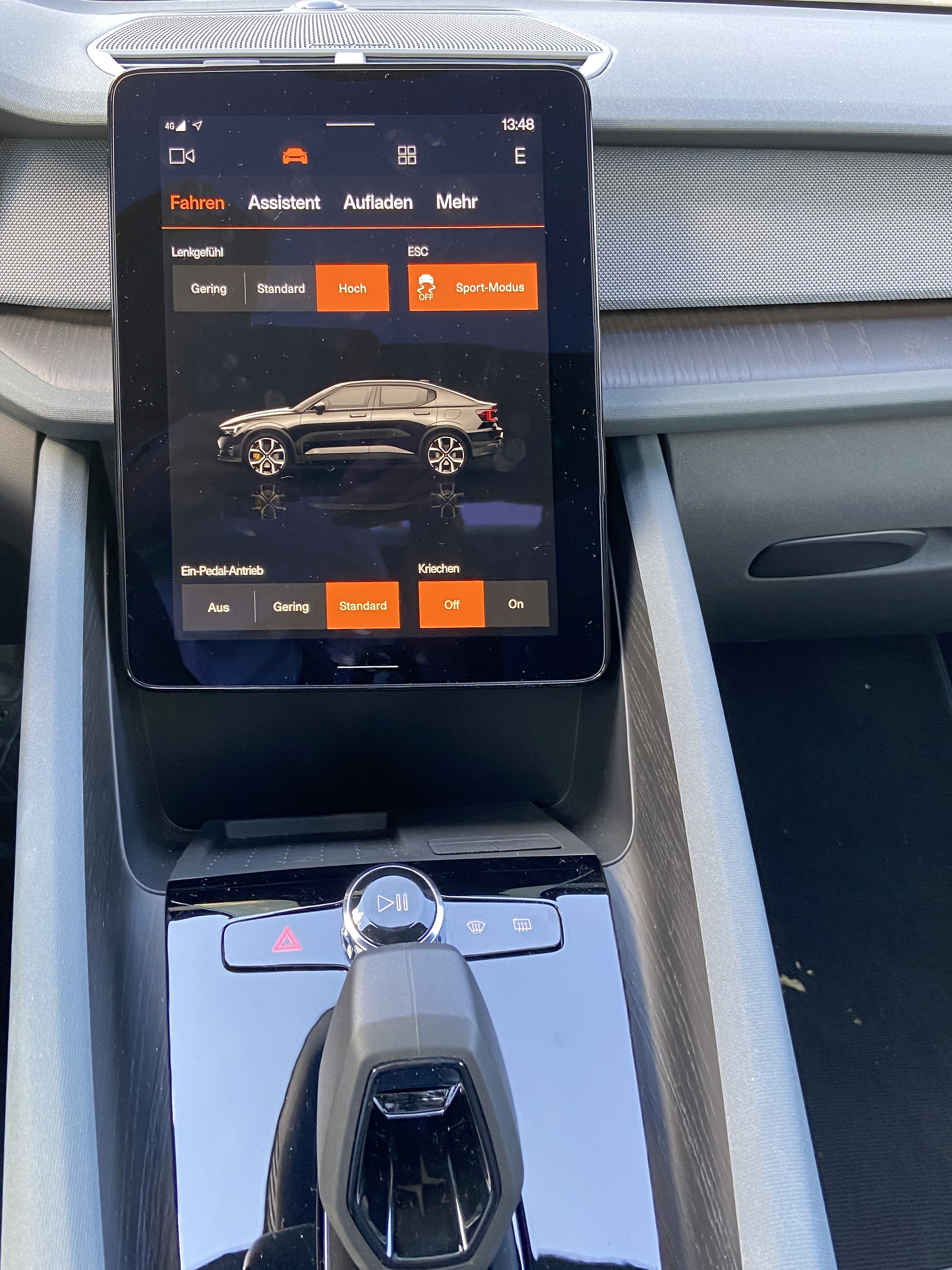
- Android Automotive running on a Polestar 2
- Developer: Google
- OS family: Android, Linux
- Initial release: March 2017; 9 years ago
- Latest release: Android Automotive 25Q4 / 22 January 2026; 9 months ago
- Kernel type: Monolithic (Linux kernel)
- Official website: built-in.google/cars/

Android Automotive (AAOS), marketed as Cars with Google built-in or colloquially just Google built-in, is an open-source operating system designed for use in vehicle dashboards, based on Android. Introduced in March 2017, it was developed by Google and Intel, together with car manufacturers such as Volvo and Audi. The project aims to provide an operating system codebase for vehicle manufacturers to develop their own distribution. Besides infotainment tasks, such as messaging, navigation and music playback, the operating system aims to handle vehicle-specific functions such as controlling the air conditioning.

Android Automotive is an open source operating system and, as such, a car manufacturer can use it without the proprietary Google Automotive Services (GAS)—which is a car equivalent to the Google Mobile Services, i.e. a collection of applications and services like Google Maps, Google Assistant, and Google Play—that OEMs can license and integrate into their in-vehicle infotainment systems. In contrast to Android Auto, Android Automotive is a full operating system running on the vehicle's hardware, not relying on a smartphone to operate. As such, it has access to a limited number of apps on the aforementioned Google Play Store. Volvo, Renault, Ford and GM are using AAOS with GAS. In order to communicate with in-vehicle networks (IVI) such as the CAN bus, Android Automotive uses the Vehicle Hardware Abstraction Layer (VHAL), which serves as a bridge between the vehicle's hardware and software components.

== History ==
The operating system was first announced by Google in March 2017.

In February 2018, Polestar announced the Polestar 2, the first car with built-in Android Automotive. The Polestar 2 with Android Automotive is available since July 2020.

In September 2018, the Renault–Nissan–Mitsubishi Alliance announced a technology partnership to embed the Android Automotive operating system in the group's vehicles starting in 2021.

In April 2019 Google opened up the APIs for developers to start developing applications for Android Automotive.

In September 2019 General Motors announced that they will use Android Automotive to power the infotainment systems in its cars starting in 2021.

In July 2020, Stellantis (formerly Groupe PSA and FCA Group) announced they would power their infotainment systems with Android Automotive OS. This announcement was revoked in 2022. Some vehicles from the group, like the 2021 Dodge Durango and Chrysler Pacifica, are already using the Android Automotive-based Uconnect 5, without the Google Automotive Services (GAS).

In February 2021, Ford announced a partnership with Google that would bring Android Automotive to Ford and Lincoln vehicles, starting in 2023.

In May 2021, Lucid Motors revealed that the Lucid Air was using Android Automotive for its infotainment system, but without the Google Automotive Services (GAS).

In September 2021, Honda announced that it would use Google's Android Automotive OS in its cars starting in 2022.

In June 2022, BMW announced that it will be expanding its BMW Operating System 8 and integrating Android Automotive into certain models, starting in March 2023. In January 2023, during the Consumer Electronics Show, BMW revealed that BMW Operating System 9 will be based on Android Automotive but without the Google Automotive Services (GAS). BMW OS 9 will feature the Aptoide app store, but lower OS versions will not.

In March 2023, the Volkswagen Group announced that its future infotainment system, called One.Infotainment, will be based on Android Automotive (AOSP version), and include an app store developed in partnership with Harman International.

In May 2023, Google introduced Android Automotive OS 14 which enabled new capabilities for navigation apps allowing them to integrated with the gauge cluster and multi screen support to expand new experiences between the driver and passengers.

In June 2023, Polestar announced its intention to use the Meizu Flyme Auto system in vehicles destined for the Chinese market rather than Android Automotive.

In October 2023, Porsche announced a collaboration with Google which will bring Android Automotive to the carmaker’s future vehicles with Google Automotive Services.

In December 2024, Hyundai Motor Group announced it adopted Google’s Android Automotive Operating System (AAOS) to further broaden its software ecosystem.

In July 2025, Mazda revealed its all-new 2026 CX-5, the first model coming with Google built-in.

In 2025, Chinese manufacturer BYD updated the infotainment systems of select international models to include Google built-in, providing native access to Google Maps and the Google Play Store.

In October 2026, Geely Holding announced a partnership to integrate built-in Google Automotive Services across brands including Geely, Lynk & Co, Proton, Riddara, and Smart. Starting in late 2027, eligible vehicles outside China and the US will feature direct dashboard access to Google Maps, Play, and Gemini. That month, XPeng announced plans to integrate Google Play into its vehicle infotainment systems, with the update scheduled to roll out in early 2027.

In November 2026, Volkswagen announced that it would adopt Android Automotive OS with Google built-in (Google Automotive Services) across upcoming models built on the MQB Evo platform, starting in October 2027. Under this transition, the automaker will replace its proprietary navigation and in-house infotainment applications, previously developed by its software subsidiary CARIAD, with native Google services.

== Automakers using Android Automotive ==
- Acura
- Alfa Romeo
- Alpine
- Audi
- BMW
- Buick
- BYD
- Cadillac
- Chevrolet
- Chrysler
- Cupra
- Dacia
- Denza
- Dodge
- Fiat
- Fisker
- Ford
- Geely
- GMC
- Honda
- Hyundai
- Ineos
- Infiniti
- Kia
- Lincoln
- Lotus
- Lucid
- Lynk & Co
- Maserati
- Mazda
- Mini
- Mitsubishi
- Nissan
- Polestar
- Porsche
- Proton
- Renault
- Rivian
- SEAT
- Škoda Auto
- Smart
- Subaru
- Togg
- Volkswagen
- Volvo
- XPeng
- Zeekr

== Vehicles with Android Automotive (with GAS) ==
- Acura ADX (2026+)
- Acura MDX (2025+)
- Acura ZDX (2024)
- Alpine A290
- Alpine A390
- Buick Enclave (2025+)
- Buick Envision (2024+)
- BYD Atto 2 DM-i
- BYD Atto 3 Evo (2026+)
- BYD Atto 8 (2026+)
- BYD Dolphin G DM-i
- BYD Dolphin Surf (2026+)
- BYD Sealion 8 (2026+)
- Cadillac Celestiq
- Cadillac CT5 (2025+)
- Cadillac Escalade (2025+)
- Cadillac Escalade IQ
- Cadillac Lyriq
- Cadillac Optiq
- Cadillac Vistiq
- Cadillac XT4 (2024+)
- Chevrolet Blazer EV
- Chevrolet Bolt (2027+)
- Chevrolet Colorado (2023+)
- Chevrolet Corvette (2024+)
- Chevrolet Equinox (2025+)
- Chevrolet Equinox EV
- Chevrolet Silverado (2022+)
- Chevrolet Silverado EV
- Chevrolet Suburban (2022+)
- Chevrolet Tahoe (2022+)
- Chevrolet Traverse (2024+)
- Denza BAO 5
- Denza D9 DM-i
- Denza Z
- Denza Z9 GT
- Ford Expedition (2025+)
- Ford Explorer (2025+)
- GMC Acadia (2024+)
- GMC Canyon (2023+)
- GMC Hummer EV
- GMC Sierra (2022+)
- GMC Terrain (2025+)
- GMC Yukon (2022+)
- Honda Accord (2023+)
- Honda CR-V (2026+)
- Honda Civic (2025+)
- Honda Passport (2025+)
- Honda Pilot (2026+)
- Honda Prelude (2026+)
- Honda Prologue
- Honda ZR-V (2026+)
- Infiniti QX60 (2026+)
- Infiniti QX80 (2025+)
- Lincoln Aviator (2025+)
- Lincoln Nautilus (2024+)
- Lincoln Navigator (2025+)
- Mazda CX-5 (2026+)
- Mitsubishi ASX (2024+)
- Mitsubishi Delica Mini (2026+)
- Mitsubishi Eclipse Cross (2026+)
- Mitsubishi Grandis (2026+)
- Nissan Ariya (2026+)
- Nissan Armada (2025+)
- Nissan Leaf (2026+)
- Nissan Micra EV
- Nissan Murano (2025+)
- Nissan Patrol (2025+)
- Nissan Pixo EV
- Nissan Qashqai (2024+)
- Nissan Rogue (2024+)
- Nissan Roox (2026+)
- Nissan Tekton
- Nissan X-Trail (2026+)
- Polestar 2
- Polestar 3
- Polestar 4
- Polestar 5
- Renault 4 E-Tech
- Renault 5 E-Tech
- Renault Austral
- Renault Boreal
- Renault Captur (2024+)
- Renault Clio (2026+)
- Renault Duster (Indian market only, 2027+)
- Renault Espace (2024+)
- Renault Mégane E-Tech Electric
- Renault Master (2024+)
- Renault Niagara
- Renault Rafale
- Renault Scénic E-Tech (2025+)
- Renault Symbioz
- Renault Twingo E-Tech
- Volvo C40 / EC40
- Volvo ES90
- Volvo EX30
- Volvo EX60
- Volvo EX90
- Volvo S60 (2023+)
- Volvo S90 (2022+)
- Volvo V60, V60 Cross Country (2023+)
- Volvo V90, V90 Cross Country (2022+)
- Volvo XC40 (excluding T2 engine model) (2023+)
- Volvo XC40 Recharge / EX40 (only BEV version)
- Volvo XC60 (2022+)
- Volvo XC90 (2023+)

== Vehicles with Android Automotive (without GAS) ==
- Alfa Romeo Tonale
- Audi Q6 e-tron (2025+)
- Audi A5 (2025+)
- Audi A6 (2025+)
- BMW X1 (2023+)
- BMW X2 (2024+)
- BMW X3 (2024+)
- BMW iX3 (2025+)
- BMW 1 Series (2024+)
- BMW 2 Series (2024+)
- Chrysler Pacifica (2021+)
- Cupra Born (2026+)
- Cupra Raval
- Cupra Tavascan (2026+)
- Dacia Duster (2024+)
- Dodge Durango (2021+)
- Dodge Hornet
- Fiat 500e
- Fisker Ocean
- Ford Capri EV (2026+)
- Ford Explorer EV (2026+)
- Genesis GV90
- Hyundai Grandeur (2026+)
- Hyundai Ioniq 3
- Ineos Grenadier
- Kia PV5
- Kia PV7
- KTM 1390 Super Adventure S (2026+)
- Lotus Eletre
- Lotus Emeya
- Lucid Air
- Lynk & Co 01
- Lynk & Co 02
- Maserati Ghibli (2022+)
- Maserati GranTurismo (2022+)
- Maserati Grecale (2022+)
- Maserati Levante (2022+)
- Maserati MC20 (2022+)
- Maserati Quattroporte (2022+)
- Mini Aceman
- Mini Cooper (2024+)
- Mini Countryman (2023+)
- Nissan Interstar (2024+)
- Porsche Macan (2024+)
- Porsche Taycan (2025+)
- Renault Filante
- Rivian R1S
- Rivian R1T
- Subaru Outback (2026+)
- Škoda Elroq (2027 model year onward)
- Škoda Enyaq (2027 model year onward)
- Škoda Epiq (2026+)
- Škoda Peaq (2026+)
- Togg T10X

== See also ==
- QNX
