= Polestar 6 =

Upcoming electric sports car by Polestar

Overview
- Manufacturer: Polestar
- Production: 2026 (to commence)
- Assembly: China
- Designer: Maximilian Missoni

Body and chassis
- Class: Roadster, sports car
- Layout: Dual-motor, all-wheel-drive
- Platform: SEA
- Related: Polestar 5

Powertrain
- Power output: 660 kW (890 hp)
- Electric range: 482 km (300 mi)

Dimensions
- Wheelbase: 2,735 mm (107.7 in)
- Length: 4,606 mm (181.3 in)

The Polestar 6 is an upcoming electric four-seater roadster to be manufactured by Polestar in 2026. The Polestar 6 will be heavily inspired by the Polestar 02, which was unveiled in March 2022 in Los Angeles.

A variant of the upcoming Polestar 6 was released in September 2022 and named ''LA concept'' due to the unveiling of the Polestar 02 in Los Angeles. Limited to only 500 examples, the vehicles sold out in one week. Following the limited release of the LA concept, a track-ready concept variant of the Polestar 6 named ''BST'' was unveiled at the 2024 Goodwood Festival of Speed.

== History ==
In March 2022, the Polestar 02 was unveiled in Los Angeles. The vehicle was an electric sports car, making it the first to be so since the Tesla Roadster in 2008. The car featured a 15-inch touchscreen, 2 doors and 4 seats. The introduction featured drone footage going up to 90 kph (56 mph) shooting videos during drives.

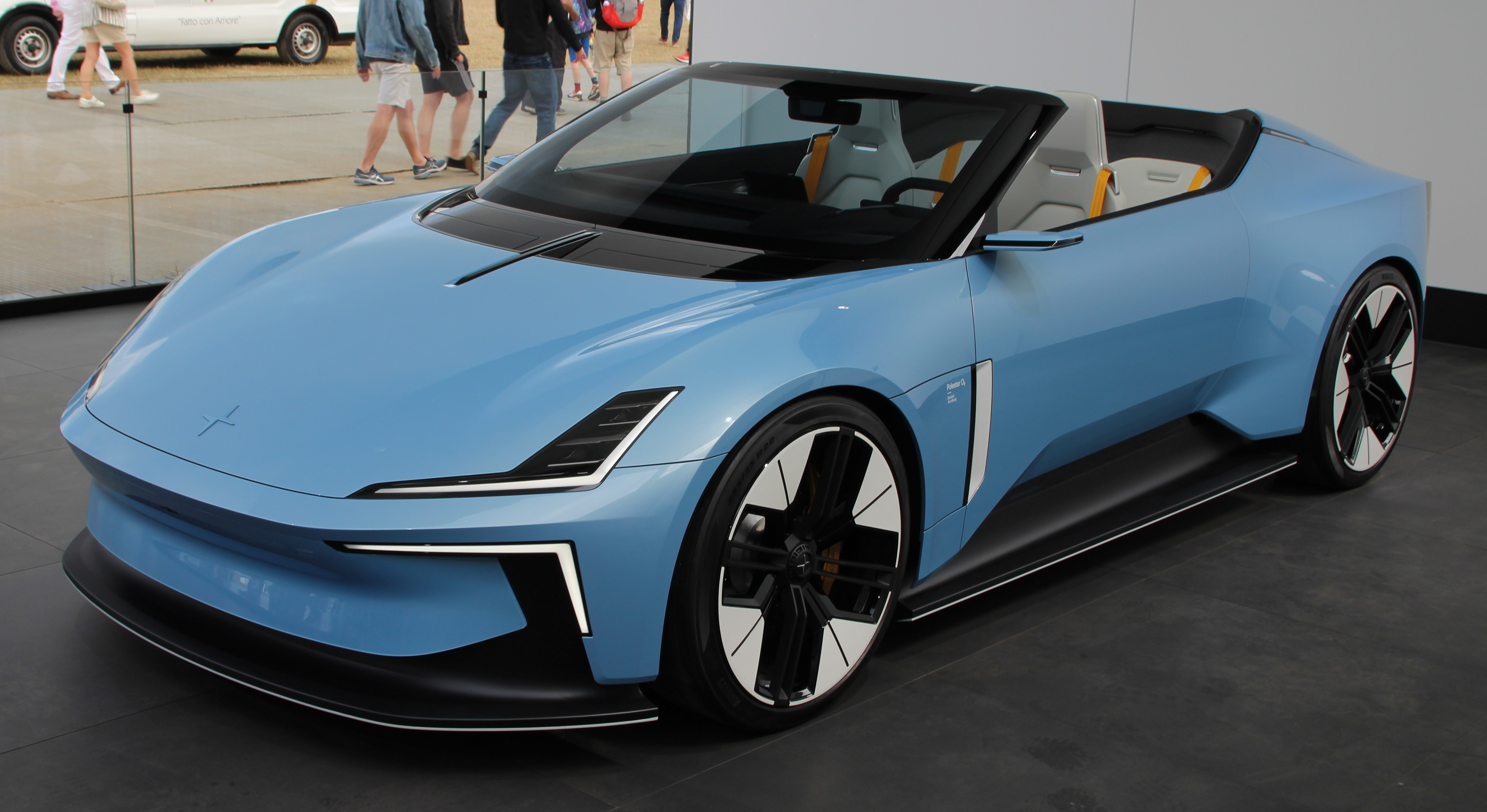
Polestar 02 concept at the 2022 Goodwood Festival of Speed

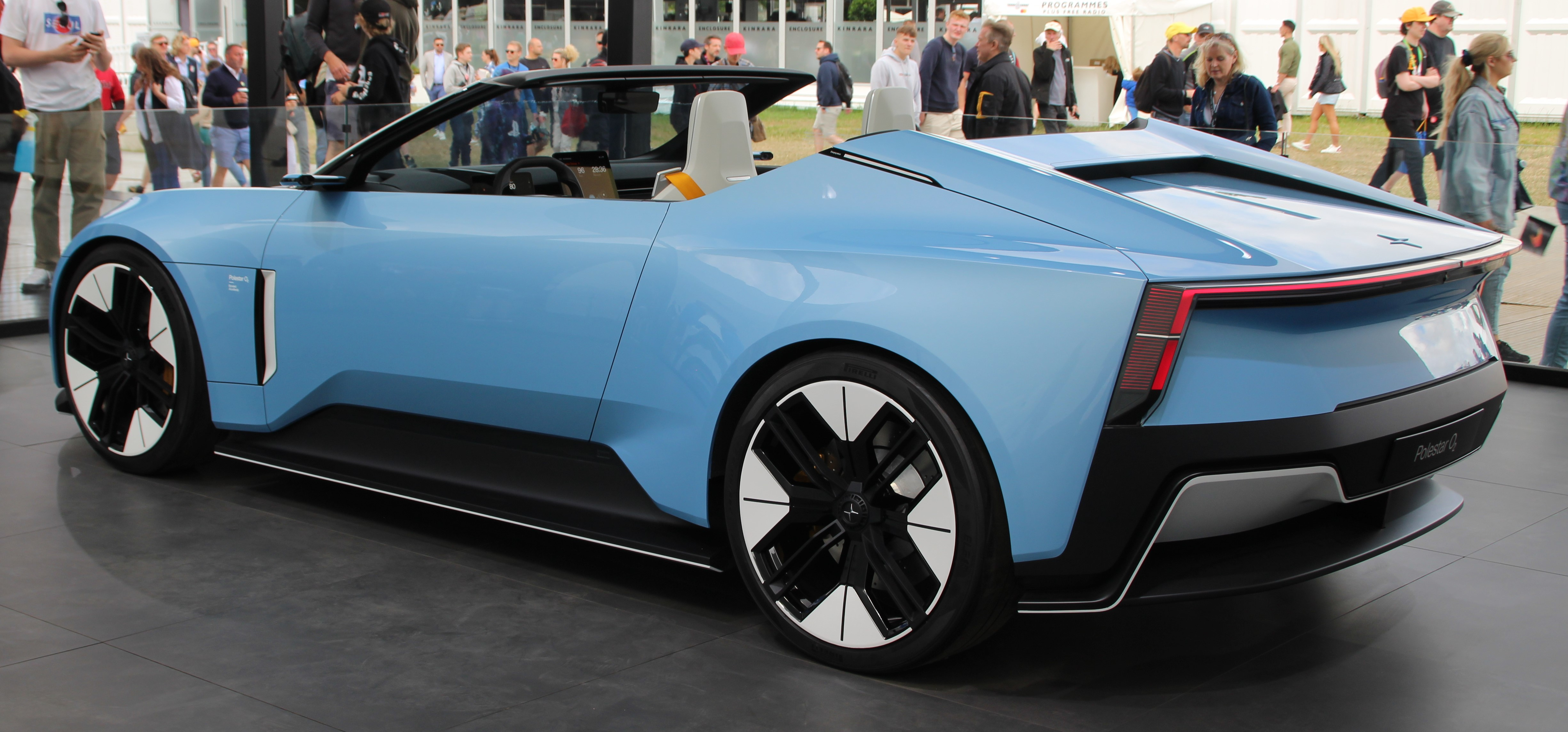
Rear view of the 02 concept

In August, Polestar announced a new model going into production in 2026 which would be heavily inspired by the 02. The 6 was unveiled as an electric sports car convertible which would use the same bonded aluminum platform as the previously announced Polestar 5. The car will possess a range of 482 kilometers (300 miles), have a power output of 660 kilowatt (884 horsepower), cost around 200,000 dollars and produce 900 Nm (663 lb-ft) from a dual motor powertrain. It was announced that the drone, which was present on the 02 concept, would not be in the Polestar 6.

== Variants ==
=== LA concept ===
Following the announcement of the Polestar 6, a variant named the ''LA concept'' was released. It had 533 mm (21 inches) wheels, a light-coloured interior, a sky-blue exterior, and only 500 units were released. Despite its 200,000 dollar price tag, all units sold out in one week.

=== BST edition ===
A track-ready variant was also announced, though unlike the LA concept, it was not released. Unveiled at the 2024 Goodwood Festival of Speed, the ''BST'' being a contraction of the word ''beast''. The vehicle features a design with a new front splitter in its hood and rear wing and 558 mm (22 inches) forged alloy wheels. The car was not the first ''BST'' edition of a vehicle Polestar produced. As the manufacturer had already made the Polestar 2 BST Edition 270.
