= Polestar Synergy =

Concept electric supercar

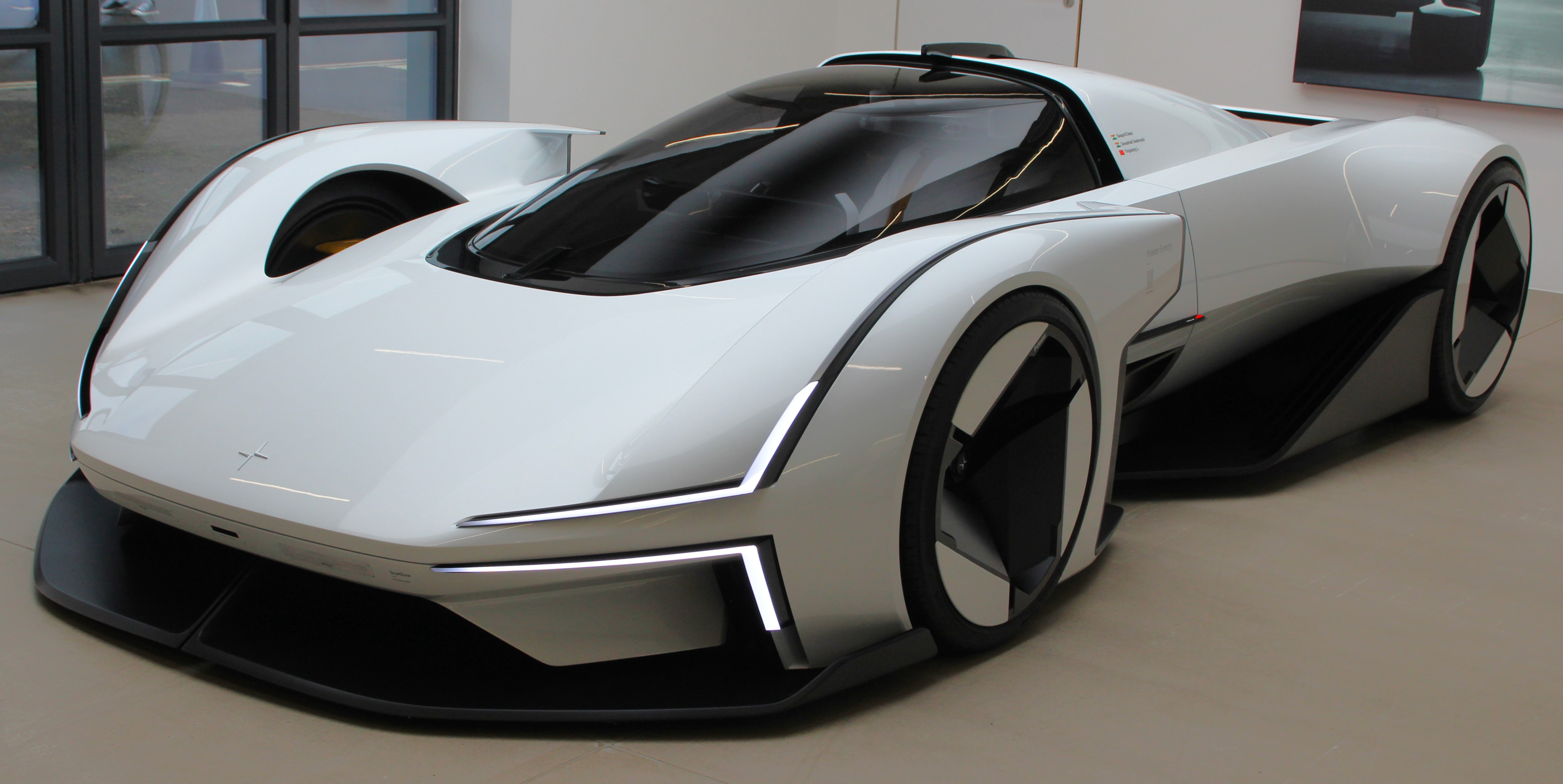
- Polestar Synergy at Bicester Heritage

Overview
- Type: Supercar concept
- Manufacturer: Polestar
- Designer: Devashish Deshmukh Swapnil Desai Yingxiang Li

Body and chassis
- Doors: 2

The Polestar Synergy is an electric supercar concept created by the Swedish automotive brand Polestar. It was unveiled at the IAA Mobility 2023 show in Munich, Germany, on 4 September 2023. The Synergy was developed as part of the 2022–2023 Polestar Design Contest and presented as a full-scale, non-drivable model.

== Development ==
The Synergy concept originated from Polestar's annual design competition. The 2022–2023 edition asked participants to design a vehicle exploring the "experience of performance" through advanced and sustainable design. More than 600 entries were submitted.

Three designers were selected as winners:

- Devashish Deshmukh (exterior, Paris, France)
- Swapnil Desai (exterior, Paris, France)
- Yingxiang Li (interior, China)

The three winners collaborated with Polestar's in-house design team for approximately six months to merge their concepts into a single full-scale vehicle.

== Design ==
The Synergy measures approximately 4.56 metres in length and 1.07 metres in height. It features a single-seat cockpit enclosed under a canopy, and an exterior design influenced by natural forms such as a hammerhead shark. The interior has a centered driving position and minimalistic controls. Sustainable materials were used in the design model.

== Technical Details ==
Polestar did not release any technical specifications for the Synergy concept. The vehicle was not equipped with a drivetrain and was built purely as a design study. No production plans have been announced.

== Presentation and Partnerships ==
The Synergy was first shown publicly at the IAA Mobility 2023 event in Munich. During the unveiling, Polestar announced a collaboration with Hot Wheels (Mattel) to integrate design themes from the toy brand into future Polestar design contests and to produce scale models of Polestar vehicles.

Following its debut, the Synergy concept was scheduled to appear at Polestar events and showrooms in multiple regions.

== Status ==
As of 2025, the Polestar Synergy remains a concept vehicle and has not entered production. It serves as an outcome of the company's global design competition and as an expression of future design direction.

== See also ==
- Polestar
