= Vahland =

Vahland is a surname. Notable people with the surname include:

- William Vahland (1828–1915), German-trained Australian architect
- Winfried Vahland (born 1957), German business executive
