= Polestar 2 =

Battery electric liftback

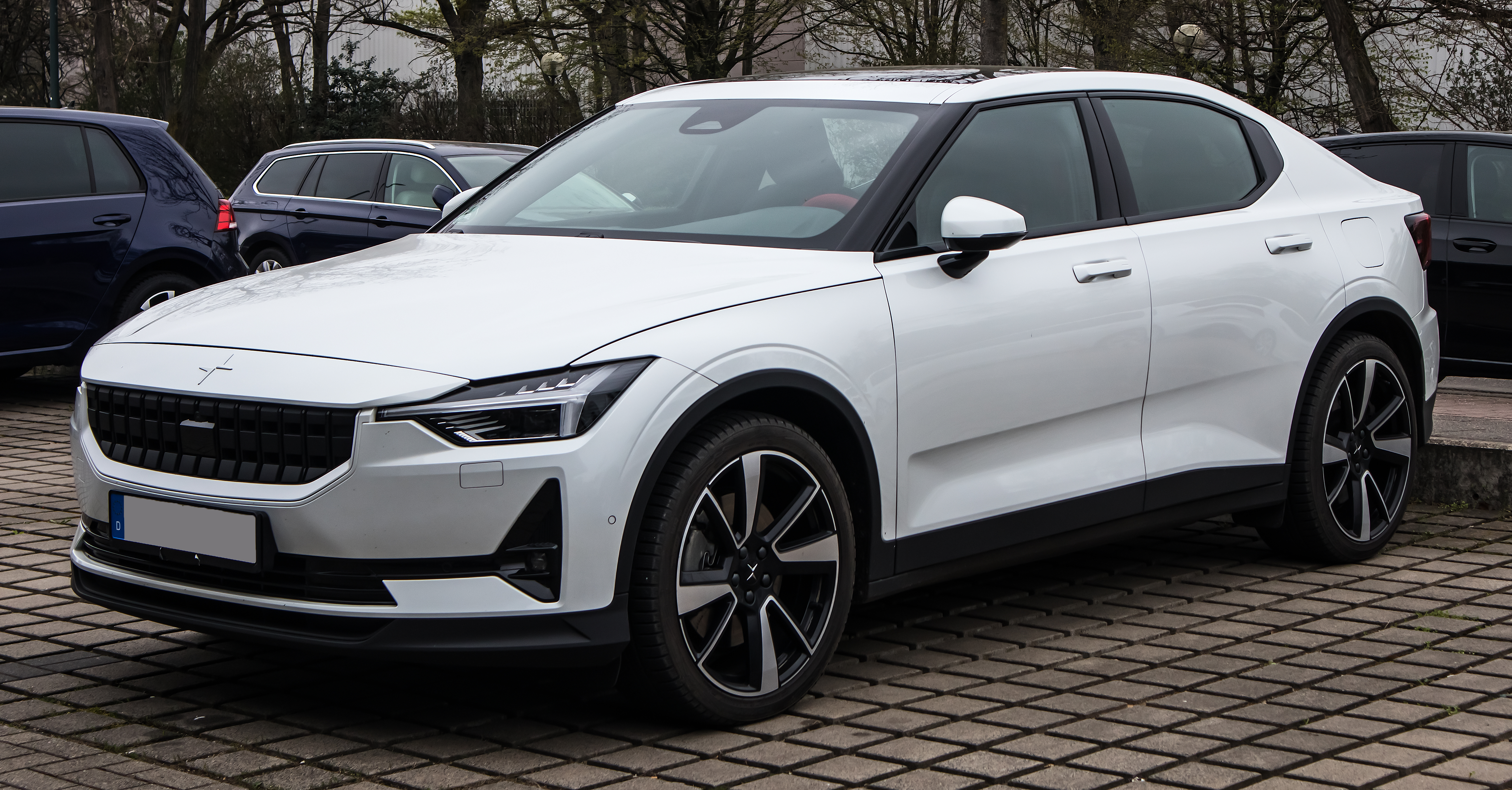

Overview
- Manufacturer: Polestar
- Production: 2020–2026

Body and chassis
- Class: Subcompact executive car (C)
- Body style: 5-door liftback

The Polestar 2 is a battery electric 5-door liftback, classified as a sedan and manufactured by Polestar, an affiliate of Geely Holding and Volvo Cars. Based on the CMA platform, production began in March 2020 at the Luqiao CMA Super Factory in Luqiao, Zhejiang, China.

== First generation (P317; 2020) ==
First generation
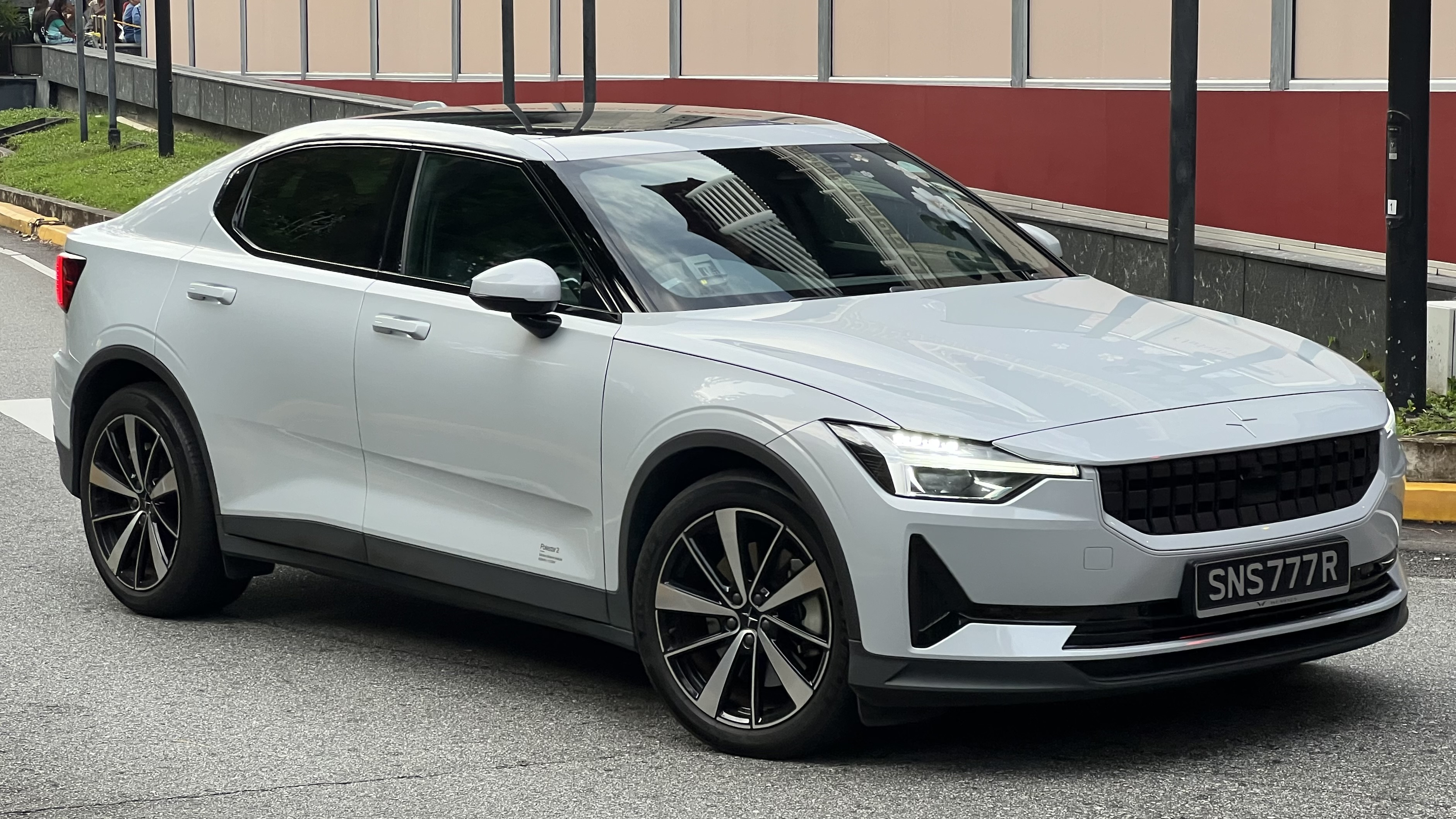

Overview
- Model code: P317
- Production: 2020–2026
- Model years: 2021–present 2021–2025 (United States)
- Assembly: China: Luqiao, Zhejiang (Luqiao CMA Super Factory)
- Designer: Thomas Ingenlath

Body and chassis
- Layout: Front-motor, front-wheel-drive (2020–2024); Rear-motor, rear-wheel-drive (2024–present); Dual-motor, all-wheel-drive
- Platform: Compact Modular Architecture
- Related: Volvo C40; Volvo XC40 Recharge

Powertrain
- Electric motor: EFAD + ERAD
- Power output: 221–469 hp (165–350 kW; 224–476 PS)
- Battery: 64 kWh NMC CATL/LGES; 69 kWh NMC LGES; 72 kWh; 78 kWh NMC LGES; 82 kWh NMC CATL
- Electric range: 473–540 km (294–336 mi) (WLTP); 233–320 mi (375–515 km) (EPA); 450–565 km (280–351 mi) (China – NEDC); 650–780 km (404–485 mi) (China – CLTC)
- Plug-in charging: DC: 135 kW–205 kW; AC: 11 kW

Dimensions
- Wheelbase: 2,735 mm (107.7 in)
- Length: 4,606 mm (181.3 in)
- Width: 1,859 mm (73.2 in)
- Height: 1,482 mm (58.3 in)
- Curb weight: 1,940–2,113 kg (4,277–4,658 lb)

The concept car that precedes its design was called the Volvo Concept 40.2. It was designed by Thomas Ingenlath alongside the Volvo Concept 40.1, which later became the basis of the XC40. These two concept cars were both unveiled in 2016. During production, Volvo decided to shift their focus to small crossovers later that year. Therefore, Polestar picked the 40.2 as the basis for their Polestar 2 design. Volvo's exterior design chief Maximilian Missoni tweaked the car's taillights, grille, and wheels in order to differentiate it as a standalone vehicle. The Polestar 2 is also the first car with Google's Android Automotive operating system built in.

Polestar 2 is the second car manufactured under the Polestar brand after the Polestar 1. The Polestar 1 is, a plug-in hybrid and limited production vehicle, making the Polestar 2 the first battery electric vehicle and mass production Polestar vehicle.

The production version was officially unveiled on 27 February 2019 during an internet livestream and made its first public appearance at the 2019 Geneva Motor Show later that month. For the 2022 model year, Polestar announced that additional options would be available for the Polestar 2.

Production of the first generation Polestar 2 ended by November 2026, with inventory sufficient to last until the launch of the second generation in 2027.

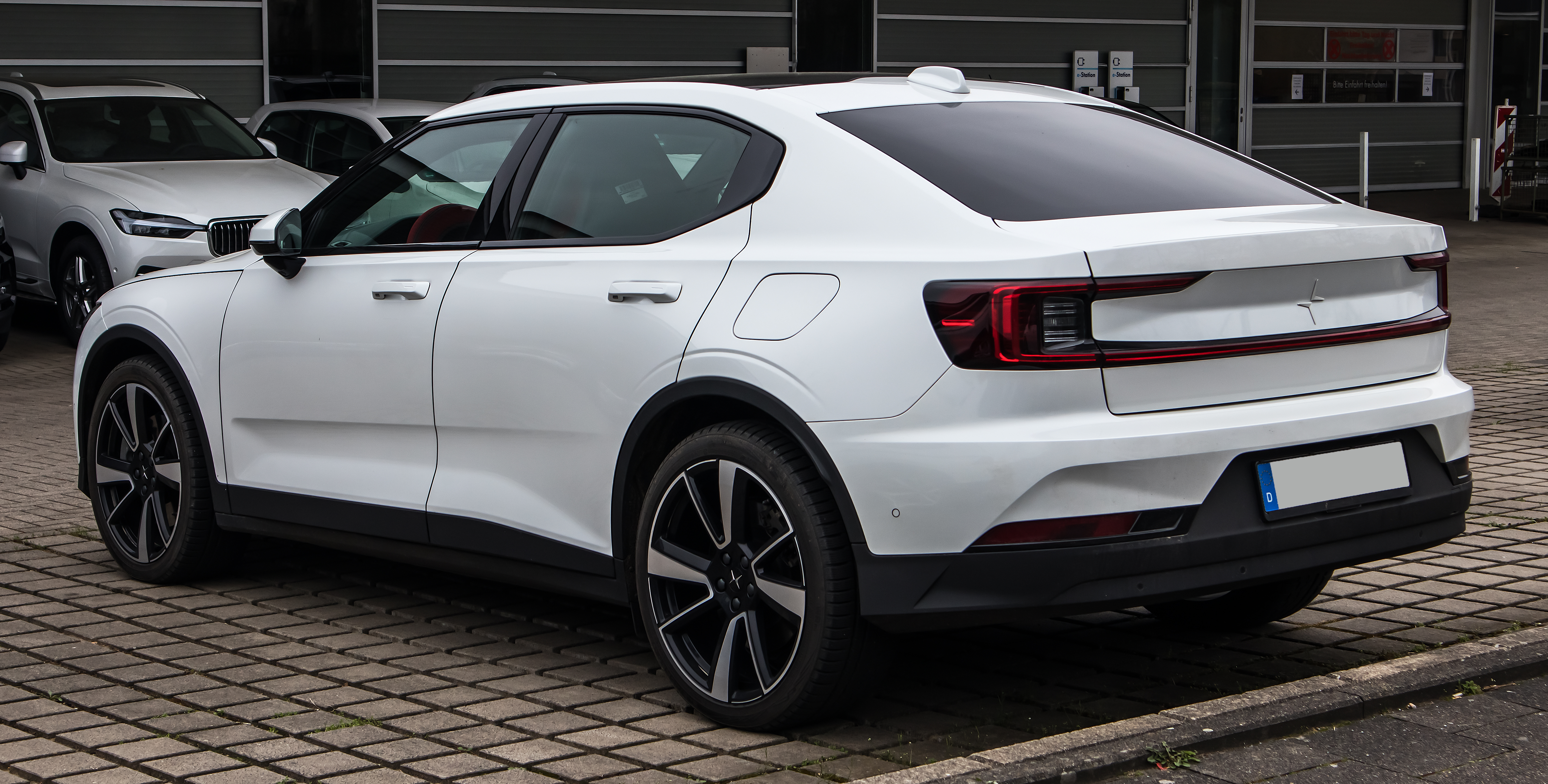
Rear view

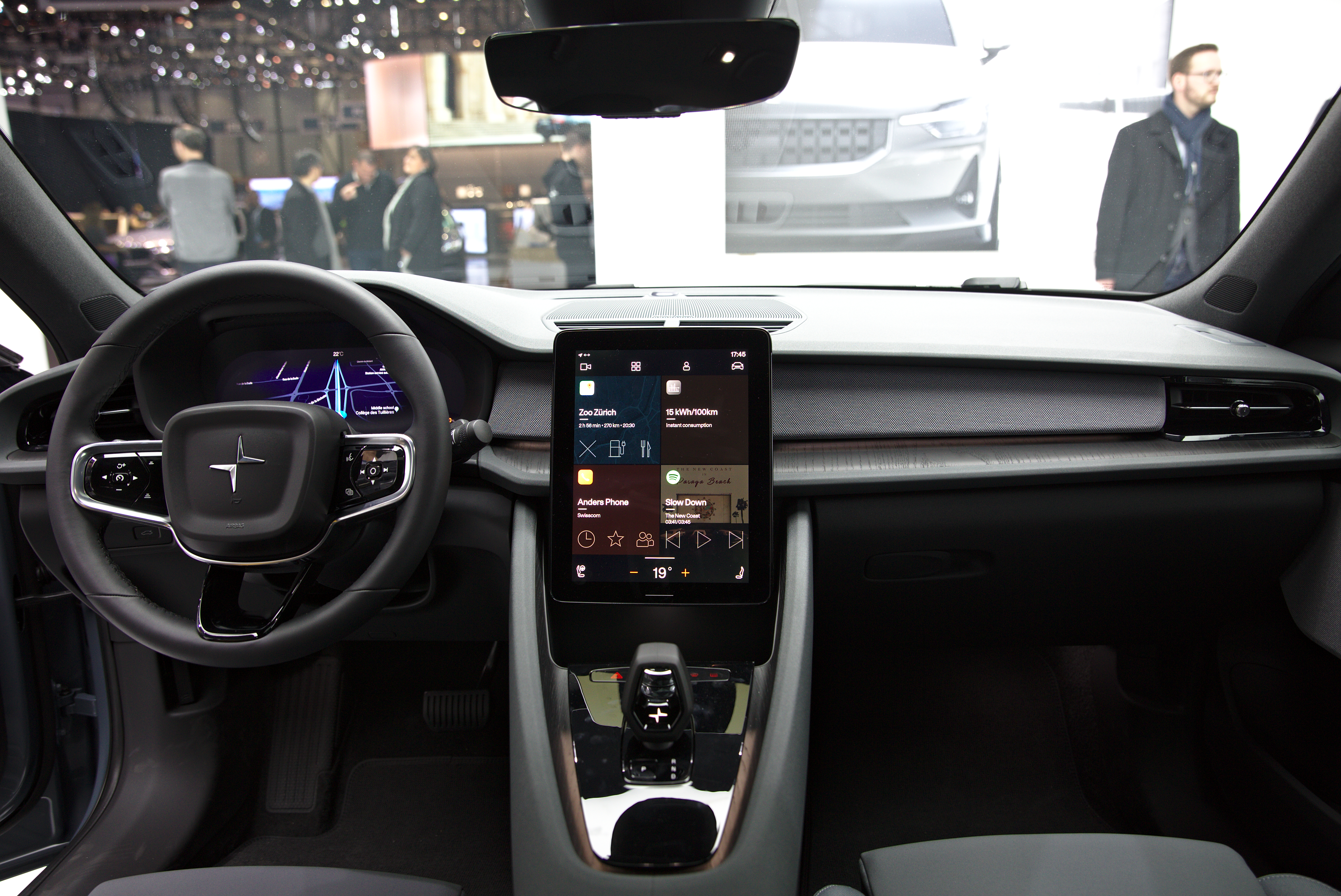
Interior

=== 2024 facelift ===
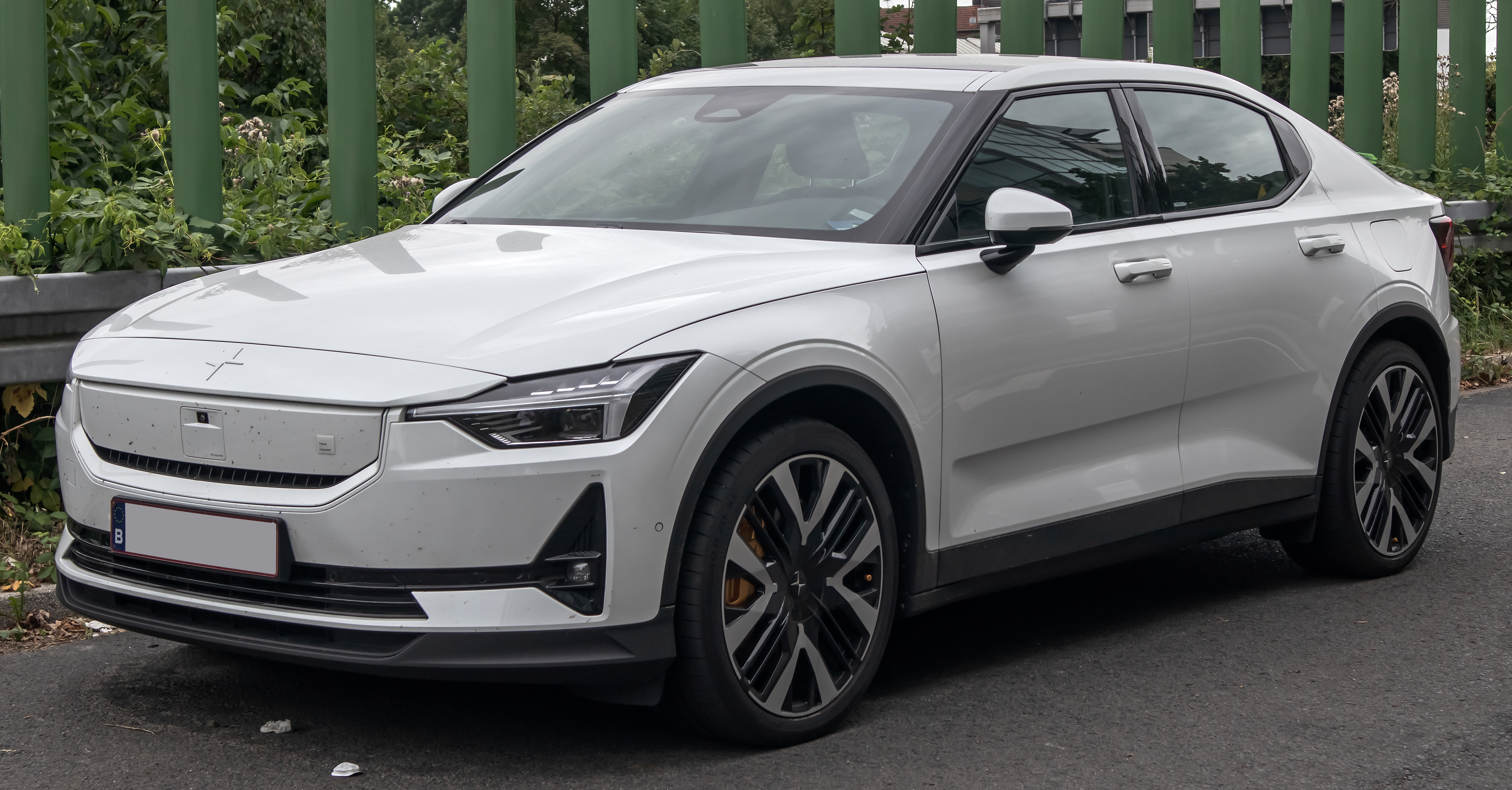
Facelift Polestar 2

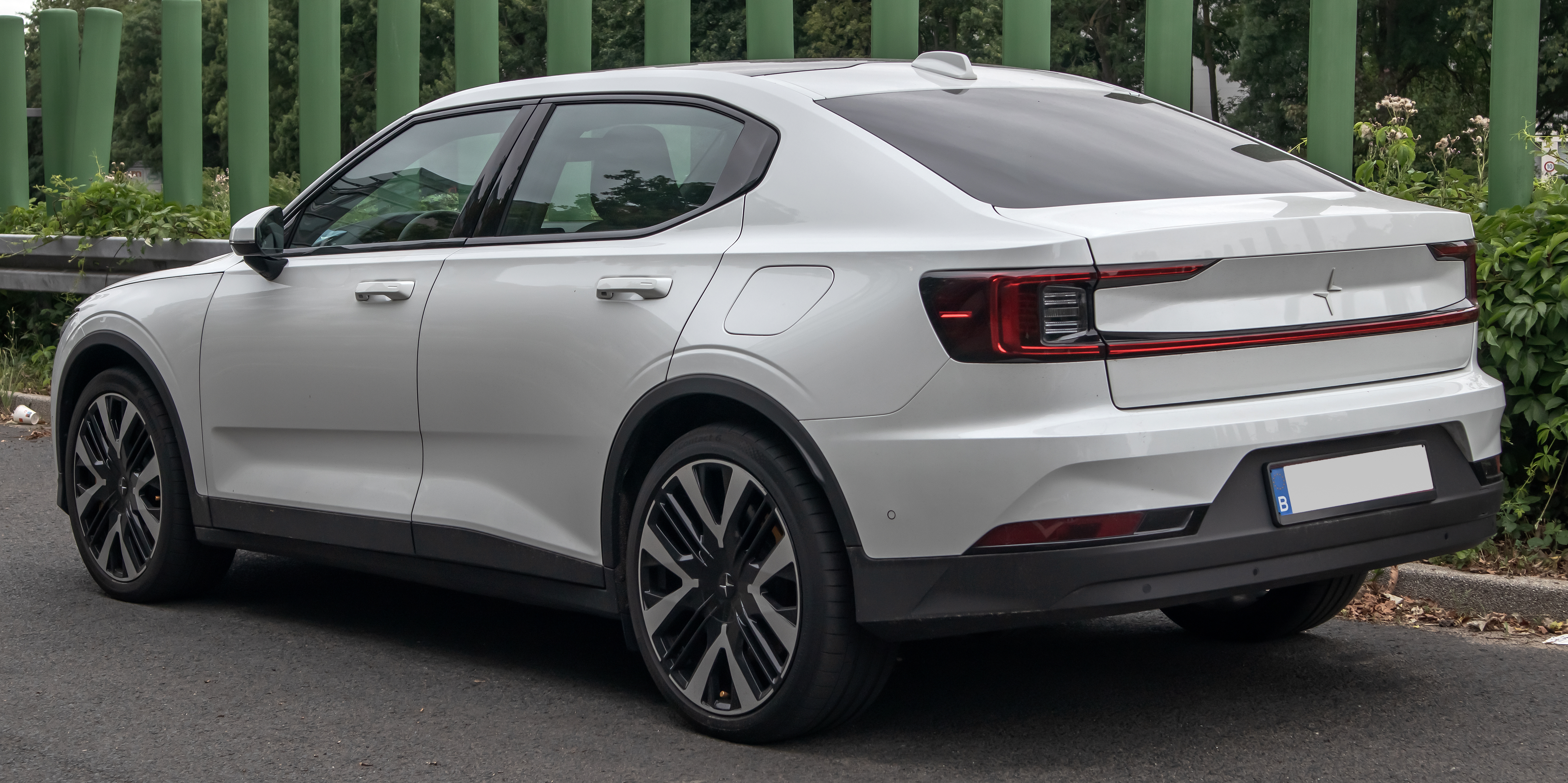
Facelift Polestar 2

An updated Polestar 2 was revealed in January 2023 for the 2024 model year, with rear-wheel drive becoming the standard drivetrain for the entry-level model instead of the previous front-wheel drive. The single motor model was upgraded to produce 299 hp (303 PS; 223 kW) and 361 lb⋅ft (489 N⋅m) of torque, an increase of 68 hp (69 PS; 51 kW) and 118 lb⋅ft (160 N⋅m), resulting in a 1.1 second faster 0–60 mph (0–97 km/h) time – now 5.9 seconds. The long range trim's battery was also upgraded to a capacity of 82 kWh. The powertrain of the dual-motor model's output was raised by 13 hp (13 PS; 9.7 kW) and 79 lb⋅ft (107 N⋅m) for a total of 421 hp (427 PS; 314 kW) and 546 lb⋅ft (740 N⋅m), enabling a 0–60 mph (0–97 km/h) time of 4.3 seconds. Dual-motor models, now using an asynchronous motor in the front, will be able to disengage the front axle to increase efficiency and range.

The front end also received an update, exchanging its grid-like grille for a more covered version, with an array of sensors and a camera in the center. In addition, the Pilot Pack will come standard for dual-motor models in the North American market.

=== BST edition 270 / 230 ===
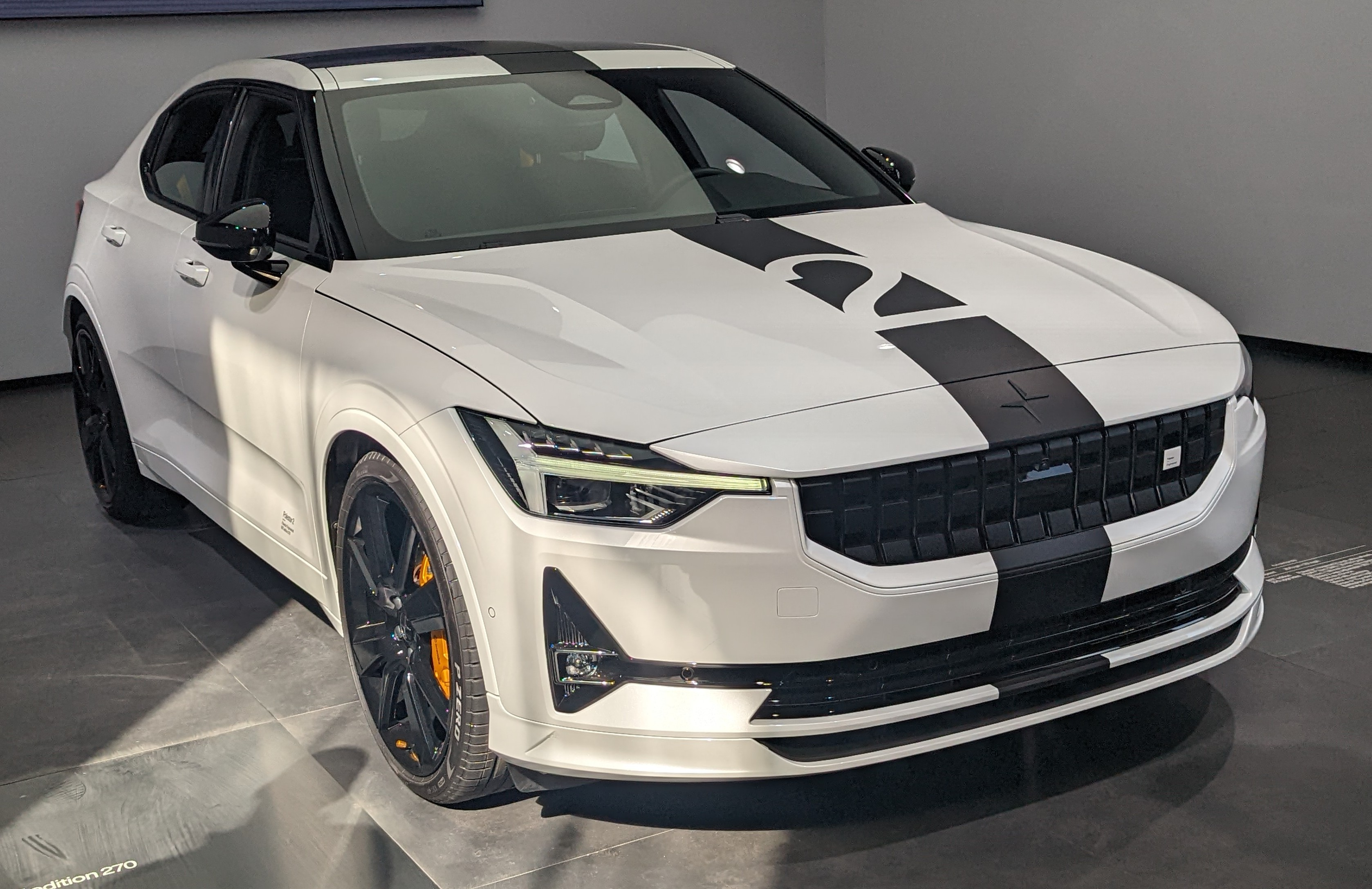
BST edition 270

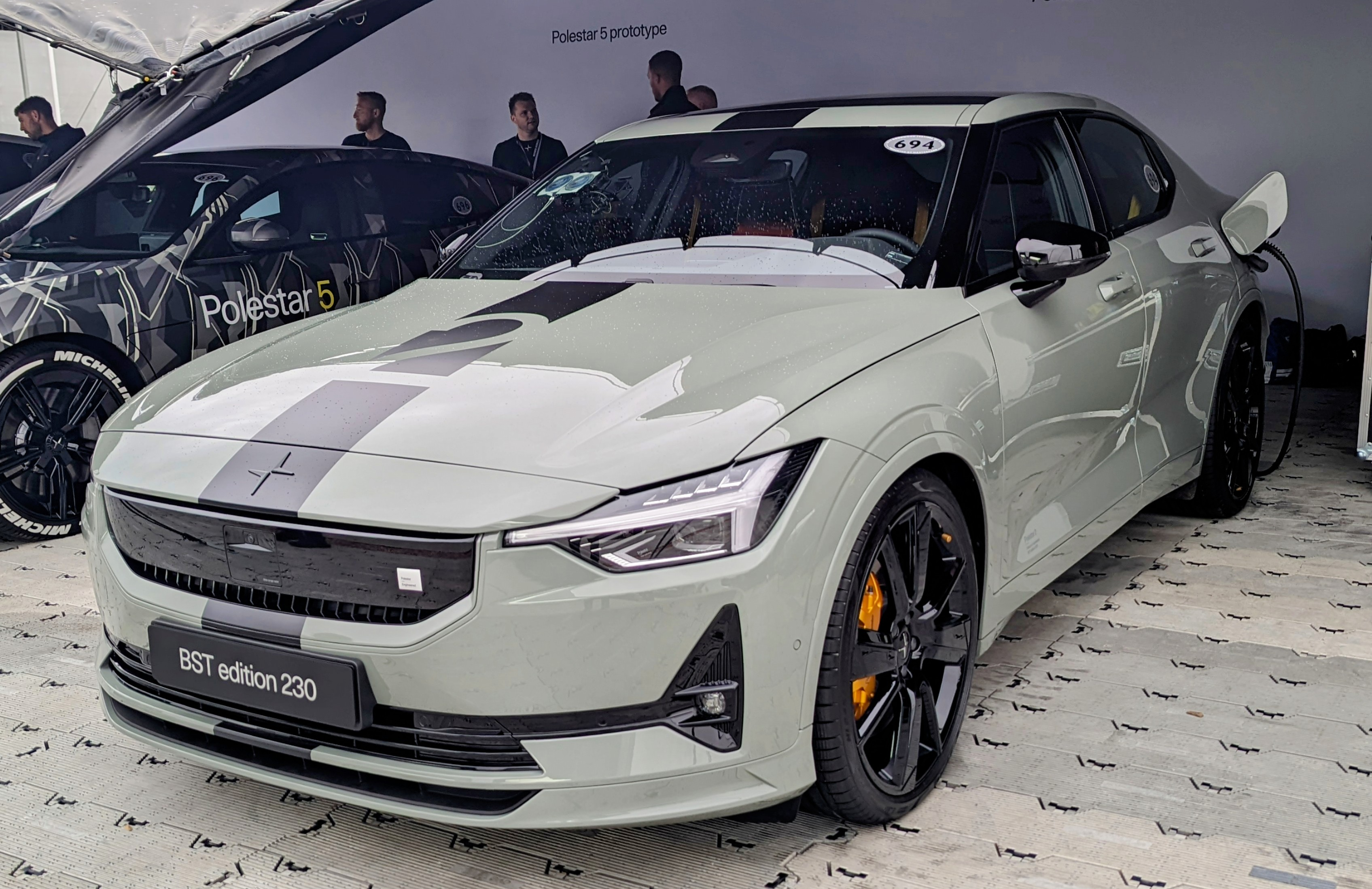
2023 Polestar 2 BST Edition 230

Launched in March 2023, the BST edition 230 is similar to the BST edition 270 introduced in June 2022, with changes including different colors and the grille insert coming from the facelifted Polestar 2.

Technical upgrades include a suspension lowered by 25 mm (0.98 in), specially designed Öhlins manually adjusted dampers, stiffened springs, bespoke Pirelli P ZERO tires, and improved performance, with the two electric motors having been tuned to produce a combined output of 470 hp (477 PS; 350 kW) and 502 lb⋅ft (681 N⋅m) of torque.

=== Safety ===
Euro NCAP test results Polestar 2 Long Range Dual Motor (LHD) (2021)
Test	Points	%
Overall:	5 /5 stars	
Adult occupant:	35.5	93%
Child occupant:	44	89%
Pedestrian:	43.5	80%
Safety assist:	13.4	83%

The Polestar 2 is designed to protect the battery pack during an impact and automatically disconnect it after a collision. On both front ends a SPOC (Severe Partial Overlap Crash) block is attached to mitigate the crash forces and prevent any material entering the occupant compartment. The Polestar 2 also features a centre airbag to protect from far-side impacts.

A seatbelt reminder system is fitted as standard equipment to the front and rear seats.

A driver-monitoring system monitors steering inputs and warns the driver if it detects those which are characteristic of drowsy driving. A speed assistance system is fitted as standard. The speed limitation information system did not meet Euro NCAP's requirements. The speed limiter can be set manually, and points were awarded for that part of the speed assistance system. A lane assistance system gently steers the car if it is drifting out of lane and also intervenes more aggressively in some critical situations.

In tests of its reaction to other vehicles, the AEB system performed well, with collisions avoided in almost all test situations.

ANCAP test results Polestar 2 (2021, aligned with Euro NCAP)
Test	Points	%
Overall:	5 /5 stars	
Adult occupant:	35.22	92%
Child occupant:	43.03	87%
Pedestrian:	43.54	80%
Safety assist:	13.23	82%

=== Recalls ===
In October 2020, Polestar issued a recall on all Polestar 2 models due to a software defect that caused loss of power to the vehicle whilst driving. As the vehicles were not capable of OTA software updates at that time it required all of the vehicles to be recalled to a service centre for a manual software update.

Later the same month a second recall was issued due to faulty inverters.

=== Specifications ===
		Standard Range – Single Motor	Long Range – Single Motor	Long Range – Dual Motor
Markets		Europe	North America, Europe	North America, Europe, Asia
Powertrain		MY 2021–2023 - FWD; MY 2024+ - RWD		AWD
Range	WLTP	473 km (294 mi)	540 km (336 mi)	481 km (299 mi)
Range	EPA	—	Year / Est. Range; 2025 / 314 mi (505 km); 2024 / 320 mi (515 km); 2023 / 270 mi (435 km); 2022 / 270 mi (435 km)	Year / Est. Range; 2025 / 278 mi (447 km); 2024 / 276 mi (444 km); 2023 / 260 mi (418 km); 2022 / 249 mi (401 km); 2021 / 233 mi (375 km)
Efficiency	WLTP	171–180 Wh/km (275–290 Wh/mi)	171–183 Wh/km (275–295 Wh/mi)	194–203 Wh/km (312–327 Wh/mi)
Efficiency	EPA	—	Year / Efficiency; 2024 / 193 Wh/km (311 Wh/mi); 2023 / 180 Wh/km (290 Wh/mi); 2022 / 180 Wh/km (290 Wh/mi)	236 Wh/km (380 Wh/mi)
Battery capacity		MY 2021–2024 - 64 kWh (usable), 69 kWh (gross) MY 2025 - 70 kWh (gross)	MY 2021–2023 - 75 kWh (usable), 78 kWh (gross) MY 2024–2025 - 79 kWh (usable), 82 kWh (gross)	MY 2021–2024 - 75 kWh (usable), 78 kWh (gross) MY 2025 - 79 kWh (usable), 82 kWh (gross)
DC charging		MY 2021–2023 - 135 kW MY 2024+ - 180 kW	MY 2021–2023 - 155 kW MY 2024+ - 205 kW	MY 2021–2024 - 155 kW MY 2025 - 205 kW
AC charging		11 kW		
Charging time	DC	80%: 35 minutes (DC @ 116 kW)	80%: 35 minutes (DC @ 155 kW)	80%: 40 minutes (DC @ 150 kW)
Charging time	AC	100%: 420 minutes (AC @ 11 kW)	100%: 420 minutes (AC @ 11 kW)	100%: 420 minutes (AC @ 11 kW)
Motor		Single Permanent-magnet synchronous motor		Dual Permanent-magnet synchronous motors
Curb weight		1,940 kg (4,280 lb)	2,040 kg (4,500 lb)	2,150 kg (4,740 lb)
Power (peak, vehicle)		MY 2021–2022 - 170 kW (228 hp) MY 2023+ - 200 kW (268 hp) or 220 kW (295 hp)		MY 2021–2023 - 310 kW (416 hp) or 335 kW (449 hp) MY 2024+ - 310 kW (416 hp) or 350 kW (469 hp)
Torque (peak, vehicle)		MY 2021–2022 - 330 N⋅m (243 ft⋅lb) MY 2023+ - 490 N⋅m (361 ft⋅lb)		MY 2021–2022 - 490 N⋅m (361 ft⋅lb) MY 2023+ - 740 N⋅m (546 ft⋅lb)
0–60 mph (97 km/h) acceleration		5.0–7.0 seconds		4.0–4.5 seconds
Top speed		MY 2021–2022 - 160 km/h (99 mph) MY 2023+ - 205 km/h (127 mph)		205 km/h (127 mph)

From September 2021 to March 2022, the Polestar 2 Single Motor Standard Range with a 64 kWh battery and 165 kW power, 224 hp was available in Europe. The battery for this version was made by CATL. The 64 kWh and 165 kW power version is available until now in China, as the only Single Motor Standard Range version.

Starting with the 2025 Model Year, only the Dual-motor variants will be available in North America.

Specifications (China)
Model year	Battery		Power	Torque	Range		DC charging		0–100 km/h (62 mph)	Top speed	Kerb weight
Model year	Type	Weight	Power	Torque	CLTC	NEDC	Peak	80%	0–100 km/h (62 mph)	Top speed	Kerb weight
2020	71 kWh	478 kg (1,054 lb)	402 hp (300 kW; 408 PS)	660 N⋅m (487 lb⋅ft)	—	450 km (280 mi)	—	—	4.7 s	205 km/h (127 mph)	—
2021	64 kWh NMC CATL/LGES	445 kg (981 lb)	221 hp (165 kW; 224 PS)	330 N⋅m (243 lb⋅ft)	—	485 km (301 mi)	—	—	7.4 s	160 km/h (99 mph)	1,958 kg (4,317 lb)
2021	78 kWh NMC CATL/LGES	495 kg (1,091 lb)	228 hp (170 kW; 231 PS)	330 N⋅m (243 lb⋅ft)	—	565 km (351 mi)	—	33 min	7.4 s	160 km/h (99 mph)	2,012 kg (4,436 lb)
2021	78 kWh NMC CATL/LGES	495 kg (1,091 lb)	402 hp (300 kW; 408 PS)	660 N⋅m (487 lb⋅ft)	—	512 km (318 mi)	—	33 min	4.7 s	205 km/h (127 mph)	2,109 kg (4,650 lb)
2024	69 kWh NMC LGES	450 kg (992 lb)	268 hp (200 kW; 272 PS)	490 N⋅m (361 lb⋅ft)	670 km (416 mi)	—	135 kW	34 min	6.4 s	205 km/h (127 mph)	1,967 kg (4,336 lb)
2024	82 kWh NMC CATL	495 kg (1,091 lb)	295 hp (220 kW; 299 PS)	490 N⋅m (361 lb⋅ft)	780 km (485 mi)	—	205 kW	28 min	6.2 s	205 km/h (127 mph)	2,034 kg (4,484 lb)
2024	78 kWh NMC LGES	491 kg (1,082 lb)	416 hp (310 kW; 422 PS)	740 N⋅m (546 lb⋅ft)	650 km (404 mi)	—	155 kW	34 min	4.5 s	205 km/h (127 mph)	2,132 kg (4,700 lb)

==== Environment ====
Using the ISO 14044 method, Polestar 2 has lower life-cycle emissions than the XC40 when driving more than 35,000 to 80,000 kilometres (22,000 to 50,000 mi), depending on conditions.

=== Delivery ===
The Polestar 2 is produced in a factory located in Chengdu, China. All cars for the European market get shipped to Shanghai, China, by train. In Shanghai, the car gets placed on a boat to Zeebrugge, Belgium. In Zeebrugge, the European cars get approved after European new-car rules before getting shipped to the destination country.

=== Markets and sales ===
Polestar 2 sales numbers
Calendar year	US	Europe	China
2020	—	20,949	
2021	—	8,746	
2022	6,729	31,871	
2023	10,350		
2024	12,903		11,967

== Second generation ==
A second generation model was announced in February 2026 for a launch in 2027. Unlike the first generation Polestar 2, it will be developed on an electric car platform.
