= Polestar 4 =

Battery electric compact luxury crossover SUV

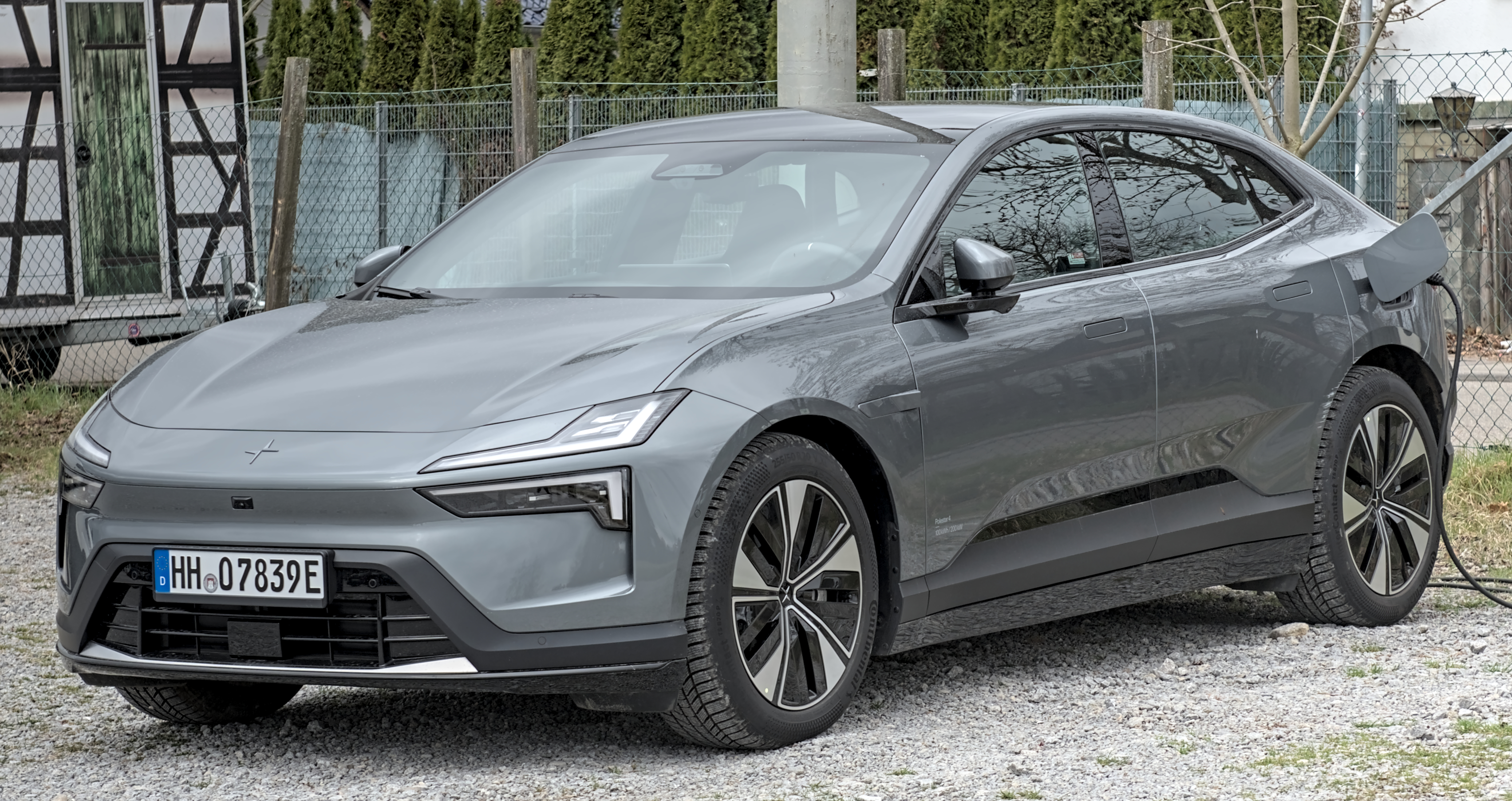

Overview
- Manufacturer: Polestar
- Model code: P417
- Production: November 2023 – present (Coupe); September 2026 – present (SUV)
- Model years: 2024–present 2026 (United States)
- Assembly: China: Ningbo; South Korea: Busan (Renault Korea; 2025–present)
- Designer: Su-bum Lee (exterior)

Body and chassis
- Class: Compact luxury crossover SUV (D)
- Body style: 5-door coupe SUV (Coupe, 2023–present); 5-door crossover wagon (SUV, 2026–present)
- Layout: Rear-motor, rear-wheel drive; Dual-motor, all-wheel-drive
- Platform: SEA (SEA2/PMA2)

Powertrain
- Electric motor: Permanent Magnet Synchronous motors
- Battery: 102 kWh nickel manganese cobalt
- Plug-in charging: 22 kW (AC); 200 kW (DC)

Dimensions
- Wheelbase: 2,999 mm (118.1 in)
- Length: 4,839 mm (190.5 in)
- Width: 2,008 mm (79.1 in); 2,139 mm (84.2 in) (with mirrors)
- Height: 1,544 mm (60.8 in)
- Kerb weight: 2,232–2,351 kg (4,921–5,183 lb)

The Polestar 4 is a battery electric compact luxury crossover SUV marketed by Polestar, an affiliate of Geely Holding and Volvo Cars, since 2023. It was originally manufactured by Geely Holding in a factory located in Hangzhou Bay, China.

It is the third vehicle to use the rear- and all-wheel drive based platform, Sustainable Experience Architecture.

The Polestar 4 was first marketed as a coupe SUV that went into production in the fourth quarter of 2023, and has two powertrain options.

== Overview ==
The vehicle was unveiled in April 2023 at the 2023 Auto Shanghai, as part of Geely's new SEA platform, where it underpins primarily battery electric vehicles, such as the Zeekr 001 and the Volvo EX30. Positioned between the smaller Polestar 2 compact executive liftback and the larger Polestar 3 mid-size luxury crossover, it belongs to the European D-segment size segmentation. Having no rear window, it instead showcases a roof-mounted camera system. Polestar claims it is the fastest production car the brand has made, accelerating from 0–62 mph (0–100 km/h) in 3.8 seconds.

The 4 is a two-row coupe crossover that has a choice of the rear-wheel-drive model where the motor is placed at the rear axle, or the performance all-wheel-drive model where the motors are placed at both the front and rear axles.

The vehicle became available in Europe, Canada, and the Asia-Pacific from late 2023.

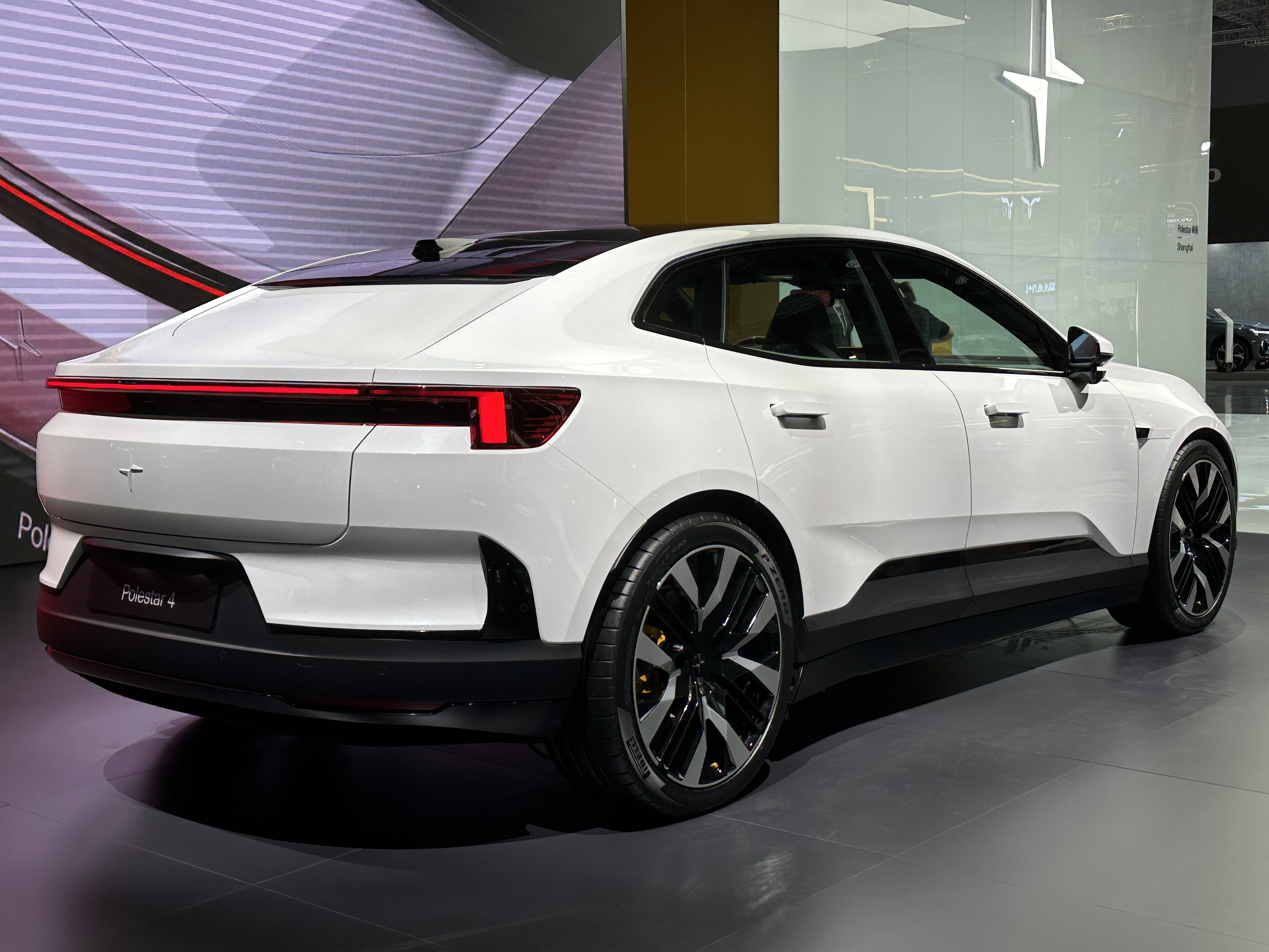
Rear view

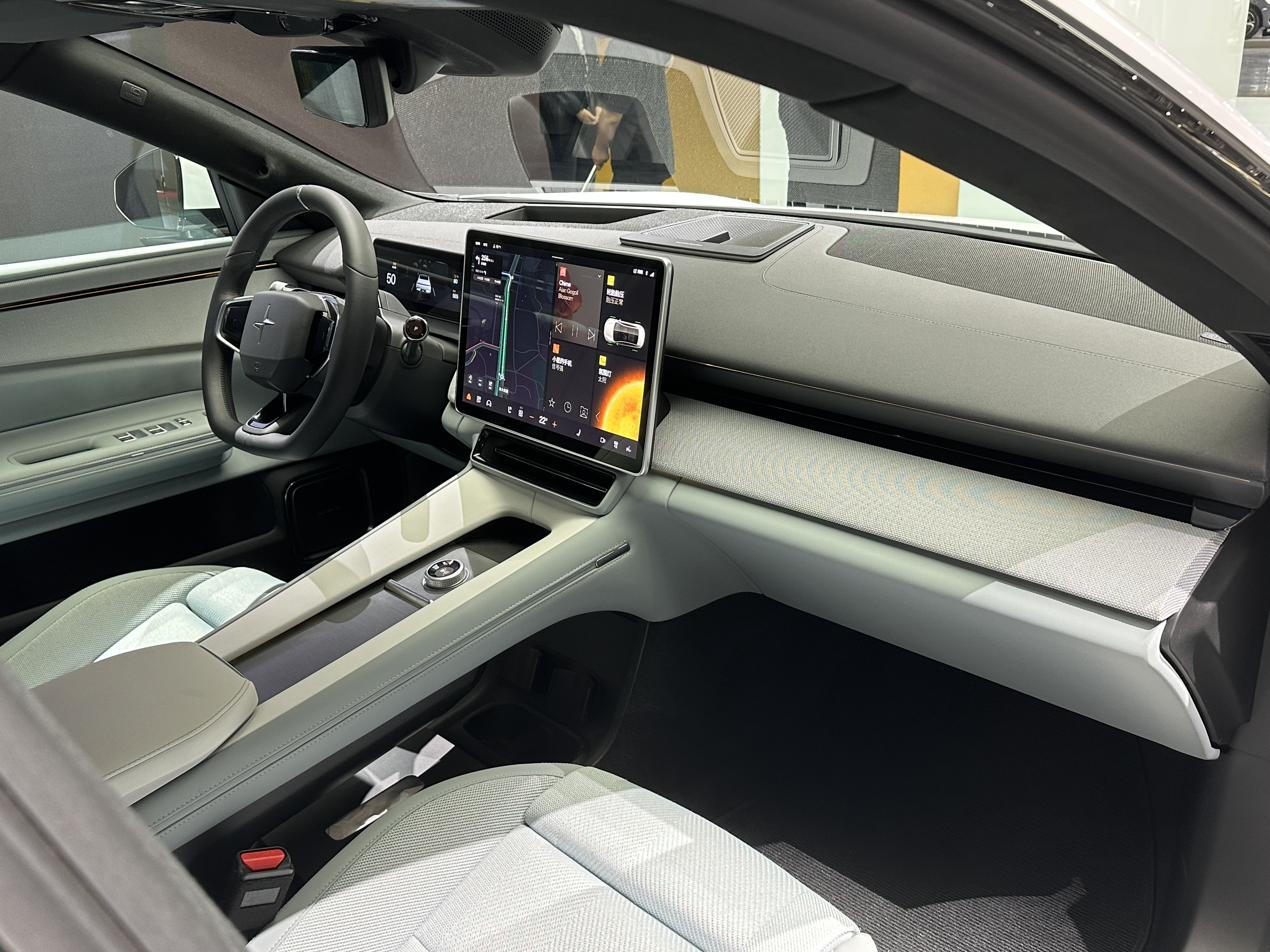
Interior

=== Equipment ===
Standard equipment includes the 15.4-inch landscape touchscreen, which runs on Android Automotive, used in the Polestar 2. A 10.2-inch digital instrument cluster and a 14.7-inch head-up display also come as standard. A full-length glass roof and a digital rear-view mirror are available, and the interior is made from 100 per cent recycled polyester, according to Polestar. The 4 features 20- to 22-inch wheels, depending on the trim chosen.

== Polestar 4 SUV ==
A variant with a more conventional SUV body style, first described by Polestar CEO Michael Lohscheller as combining "the space of an estate and the versatility of an SUV with the dynamic performance that is Polestar", was first announced on 18 February 2026, for a planned launch later that year.

Also described as an estate with crossover looks, it was announced five months later on 7 July 2026 and is called the Polestar 4 SUV. Unlike its coupe SUV sibling, the SUV notably has roof rails and a rear window.

=== Reveal ===
Two months later, the Polestar 4 SUV was fully revealed on 2 September 2026.

Front

Rear View

=== Production and availability ===
==== Assembly plant ====
The Polestar 4 SUV is produced at the Renault Korea plant in Busan, South Korea, built alongside the coupé SUV model, which has since been referred to as the Polestar 4 Coupé.

==== Markets ====
The Polestar 4 SUV is set to be sold alongside its coupé SUV sibling. During the vehicle's reveal, sales in the United Kingdom commenced at the same time.

It will be offered first in Europe, followed by other global markets such as Canada, Korea, and Asia-Pacific including Australia and New Zealand.

=== US launch exclusion ===
Originally, when it was first teased in mid-February 2026 during a webcast strategy, Polestar CEO Michael Lohscheller confirmed that the wagon-like variant of the Polestar 4, later referred to as the Polestar 4 SUV, was ‘absolutely’ coming to the United States to rival the Chevy Blazer EV and Subaru Trailseeker, and it was supposed to arrive in the market in the fourth quarter of the year.

However, seven months later, during the vehicle's reveal in early September of the same year, the US market launch of the Polestar 4 SUV was being excluded for the foreseeable future. Since late June 2026, this was the result of Polestar withdrawing from the US market entirely, following a ruling by the Department of Commerce's Bureau of Industry and Security, which denied the Swedish-Chinese automaker's authorization to sell new vehicles in the United States, starting with the 2027 model year.

The denial stemmed from the US government's Connected Vehicle Rule, which restricts vehicles utilizing Chinese-linked software and hardware due to national security and data routing concerns, and Polestar failed to secure a waiver and was forced to discontinue vehicle sales in the U.S. market under the Connected Vehicle Security Act after the 2026 model year.

== Powertrain ==
The 4 consists of two models, the Single Motor RWD and the Dual Motor AWD. The Single Motor generates 272 hp (203 kW) and 343 N⋅m (253 lbf⋅ft), with a top speed of 180 km/h (110 mph) and a 0–62 mph (0–100 km/h) of 7.4 seconds. The Dual Motor generates a combined output of 544 hp (406 kW) and 686 N⋅m (506 lbf⋅ft) using both its motors, with a top speed of 200 km/h (120 mph) and a 0–62 mph (0–100 km/h) of 3.8 seconds. Both models use a 400 V, 102 kWh lithium nickel manganese cobalt battery.

Type	Model	Number of motors	Range	Power	Torque	Combined system output	Electric motor	Battery	Transmission	Layout	Cal. years
BEV	Single Motor	1	600 km (370 mi)^{WLTP} 483 km (300 mi)^{EPA}	203 kW (272 hp; 276 PS)	343 N⋅m (35.0 kg⋅m; 253 lb⋅ft)	-	1x PMSM	102 kWh, 400 V nickel manganese cobalt	1-speed direct-drive	RWD	
BEV	Single Motor	1	600 km (370 mi)^{WLTP} 483 km (300 mi)^{EPA}	203 kW (272 hp; 276 PS)	343 N⋅m (35.0 kg⋅m; 253 lb⋅ft)	-	1x PMSM	102 kWh, 400 V nickel manganese cobalt	1-speed direct-drive	RWD	2023–present
BEV	Dual Motor	2	560 km (350 mi)^{WLTP} 435 km (270 mi)^{EPA}	Front motor: 203 kW (272 hp; 276 PS) Rear motor: 203 kW (272 hp; 276 PS)	Front motor: 343 N⋅m (35.0 kg⋅m; 253 lb⋅ft) Rear motor: 343 N⋅m (35.0 kg⋅m; 253 lb⋅ft)	400 kW (536 hp; 544 PS) / 686 N⋅m (70.0 kg⋅m; 506 lb⋅ft)	2x PMSM	102 kWh, 400 V nickel manganese cobalt	1-speed direct-drive	AWD	
BEV	Dual Motor	2	560 km (350 mi)^{WLTP} 435 km (270 mi)^{EPA}	Front motor: 203 kW (272 hp; 276 PS) Rear motor: 203 kW (272 hp; 276 PS)	Front motor: 343 N⋅m (35.0 kg⋅m; 253 lb⋅ft) Rear motor: 343 N⋅m (35.0 kg⋅m; 253 lb⋅ft)	400 kW (536 hp; 544 PS) / 686 N⋅m (70.0 kg⋅m; 506 lb⋅ft)	2x PMSM	102 kWh, 400 V nickel manganese cobalt	1-speed direct-drive	AWD	2023–present

== Charging ==
Model	AC charging	DC charging	Charge Port
Single Motor	22 kW	200 kW	
Single Motor	22 kW	200 kW	Type 2
Dual Motor	22 kW	200 kW	Type 2

== Safety ==
=== Euro NCAP ===
Euro NCAP test results Polestar 4 Long Range Single Motor (2WD) (LHD) (2025)
Test	Points	%
Overall:	5 /5 stars	
Adult occupant:	37	92%
Child occupant:	42	85%
Pedestrian:	51.6	81%
Safety assist:	14.3	79%

=== ANCAP ===
ANCAP test results Polestar 4 (2025, aligned with Euro NCAP)
Test	Points	%
Overall:	5 /5 stars	
Adult occupant:	37	92%
Child occupant:	43	87%
Pedestrian:	51.62	81%
Safety assist:	14.26	79%

== Sales ==
Year	China
2024	19,335
