= Polestar Formula 2030 =

Overview
- Manufacturer: Polestar

Body and chassis
- Class: Concept car
- Body style: 5-door hatchback
- Doors: Conventional (front); Suicide (rear)

Dimensions
- Wheelbase: 2,780 mm (109.4 in)
- Length: 4,680 mm (184.3 in)
- Width: 2,021 mm (79.6 in)
- Height: 1,350 mm (53.1 in)

The Polestar Formula 2030 is a concept car developed by Polestar, a subsidiary of Volvo Cars and Geely. It was officially unveiled on 10 November 2026.

== Overview ==
The Formula 2030 serves purely as a design study that previews the upcoming Polestar 7 as well as the second generation Polestar 2. It is not currently scheduled for production. It has attributes of a hatchback, shooting brake and wagon; it is marketed as a "practical four-door sports car" by Polestar.

=== Design ===
The Formula 2030 debuts an updated design language for Polestar, featuring the brand's signature "Dual Blade" headlights, a clamshell bonnet and a wraparound windshield. A single windshield wiper is used, resting vertically by default. It forgoes the rear light bar present in all previous Polestar models and instead uses separated "Single Blade" taillights. The exterior and the 22-inch four-spoke wheel are painted in a white paint known as "Nitrogen". The car features four doors, with conventional front doors and rear-hinged rear doors. A traditional B-pillar is absent. The brand's signature "Swedish Gold" color is featured around the car, including the seatbelts, brake callipers, and the hood struts.

The interior features a curved 20-inch widescreen display for the driver, as well as a smaller 12.2-inch central display that can rise up or fall flat on the dashboard. Below that, there is a sliding drive mode selector and fully analog and customizable switchgear. The seat backs feature a sustainable flax-based material. Similar to previous Polestar models, the Formula 2030 also features prominent labeling around parts of the vehcle, such as on the steering column and the interior door handle. It has both a trunk and a frunk, the former of which has a transparent floor.
