= List of Volvo Car production plants =

The following list includes manufacturing and assembly plants wholly owned or wholly operated by the Volvo Car Corporation, in addition to joint-venture plants in which Volvo Car held equity stakes.

The list excludes plants belonging to AB Volvo and Volvo Car parent companies, as well as contract assembly plants in which Volvo Car held no equity stake.

List of Volvo Car manufacturing, assembly and joint-venture plants
Name	WMI (Note: The first three characters of the vehicle identification number (VIN).)	Plant code (Note: The eleventh character of the vehicle identification number (VIN).)	Location	Commenced production	Notable milestones	Operational scale (Note: Legend Manufacturing : This plant manufactures cars (includes body stamping). The majority of parts and components are sourced locally. This plant is highly automated. Assembly : This plant assembles cars (does not include body stamping). The majority of parts and components are imported or sourced from knock-down (SKD or CKD) kits. This plant is not highly automated.)	Production (2010)	Markets served
Lundby Plant			Lundby, Sweden	1927–1973	First Volvo Car plant	Manufacturing		Worldwide
Lundby Plant			Lundby, Sweden	1927–1973	Debut model: Volvo ÖV 4	Manufacturing		Worldwide
Lundby Plant			Lundby, Sweden	1927–1973	Purchased from SKF (1930)	Manufacturing		Worldwide
Lundby Plant			Lundby, Sweden	1927–1973	Transferred to Volvo Trucks and Volvo Penta	Manufacturing		Worldwide
Torslanda Plant; Volvo Cars Torslanda (VCT)	YV1	1	Torslanda, Sweden	1962–present	Second Volvo Car plant	Manufacturing	XC60, V60, V60 Cross Country, XC90	Worldwide
Torslanda Plant; Volvo Cars Torslanda (VCT)	YV1	1	Torslanda, Sweden	1962–present	Debut model: Volvo Amazon	Manufacturing	XC60, V60, V60 Cross Country, XC90	Worldwide
Dartmouth Plant			Dartmouth, Nova Scotia, Canada	1963–1967	First Volvo Car plant outside Sweden	Assembly		Canada
Dartmouth Plant			Dartmouth, Nova Scotia, Canada	1963–1967	Third non-domestic automobile plant in North America	Assembly		Canada
Dartmouth Plant			Dartmouth, Nova Scotia, Canada	1963–1967	Debut model: Volvo Canadian	Assembly		Canada
Dartmouth Plant			Dartmouth, Nova Scotia, Canada	1963–1967	Canadian assembly shifted to Halifax Plant (1967)	Assembly		Canada
Ghent Plant; Volvo Car Gent (VCG)	YV1	2	Ghent, Belgium	1965–present	Second Volvo Car plant outside Sweden	Assembly (1965–1972) Manufacturing (1972–present)	XC40, V60, EX30, EC40	Worldwide
Ghent Plant; Volvo Car Gent (VCG)	YV1	2	Ghent, Belgium	1965–present	Debut model: Volvo Amazon	Assembly (1965–1972) Manufacturing (1972–present)	XC40, V60, EX30, EC40	Worldwide
Ghent Plant; Volvo Car Gent (VCG)	YV1	2	Ghent, Belgium	1965–present	Previously named Volvo Cars Europe Industry (1965–2007)	Assembly (1965–1972) Manufacturing (1972–present)	XC40, V60, EX30, EC40	Worldwide
Halifax Plant; Volvo Halifax Assembly (VHA)		3	Halifax, Nova Scotia, Canada	1967–1987	Debut model: Volvo 144	Assembly		Canada, United States
Halifax Plant; Volvo Halifax Assembly (VHA)		3	Halifax, Nova Scotia, Canada	1967–1987	Canadian assembly shifted to Bayers Lake Assembly Plant (1987)	Assembly		Canada, United States
Shah Alam Plant; Volvo Car Manufacturing Malaysia (VCMM)	PNV	5	Shah Alam, Malaysia	1967–present	First Volvo Car plant in Asia	Manufacturing	XC40, S60, XC60, S90, XC90, C40, EX30	Southeast Asia, Taiwan
Shah Alam Plant; Volvo Car Manufacturing Malaysia (VCMM)	PNV	5	Shah Alam, Malaysia	1967–present	First automobile plant in Malaysia	Manufacturing	XC40, S60, XC60, S90, XC90, C40, EX30	Southeast Asia, Taiwan
Shah Alam Plant; Volvo Car Manufacturing Malaysia (VCMM)	PNV	5	Shah Alam, Malaysia	1967–present	Debut model: Volvo 144	Manufacturing	XC40, S60, XC60, S90, XC90, C40, EX30	Southeast Asia, Taiwan
Shah Alam Plant; Volvo Car Manufacturing Malaysia (VCMM)	PNV	5	Shah Alam, Malaysia	1967–present	Previously named Swedish Motor Assemblies (SMA) (1966–2012)	Manufacturing	XC40, S60, XC60, S90, XC90, C40, EX30	Southeast Asia, Taiwan
Kalmar Plant; Volvo Kalmar Assembly (VKA)	YV1	0	Kalmar, Sweden	1974–1994	Third Volvo Car plant in Sweden	Manufacturing		Worldwide
Kalmar Plant; Volvo Kalmar Assembly (VKA)	YV1	0	Kalmar, Sweden	1974–1994	Debut model: Volvo 164	Manufacturing		Worldwide
Kalmar Plant; Volvo Kalmar Assembly (VKA)	YV1	0	Kalmar, Sweden	1974–1994	Shut down (1994)	Manufacturing		Worldwide
Born Plant; Netherlands Car (NedCar)	XLB; YV1	F	Born, Netherlands	1975–2004	Purchased from DAF (1975)	Manufacturing		Worldwide
Born Plant; Netherlands Car (NedCar)	XLB; YV1	F	Born, Netherlands	1975–2004	Debut model: Volvo 66	Manufacturing		Worldwide
Born Plant; Netherlands Car (NedCar)	XLB; YV1	F	Born, Netherlands	1975–2004	Sold to Mitsubishi Motors (2001)	Manufacturing		Worldwide
Samut Prakan Plant; Thai-Swedish Assembly (TSA)			Samut Prakan, Thailand	1976–2011	Debut model: Volvo 240	Assembly		Southeast Asia
Samut Prakan Plant; Thai-Swedish Assembly (TSA)			Samut Prakan, Thailand	1976–2011	Sold to AB Volvo (2008)	Assembly		Southeast Asia
Bayers Lake Assembly Plant			Clayton Park, Nova Scotia, Canada	1987–1998	Debut model: Volvo 740	Assembly		Canada, United States
Bayers Lake Assembly Plant			Clayton Park, Nova Scotia, Canada	1987–1998	Shut down (1998)	Assembly		Canada, United States
Uddevalla Plant; Auto Nova Plant (1995–2003); Pininfarina Sverige (2003–2013)	YV1	J	Uddevalla, Sweden	1988–1993; 1997–2013	Debut model: Volvo 740	Custom		Worldwide
Uddevalla Plant; Auto Nova Plant (1995–2003); Pininfarina Sverige (2003–2013)	YV1	J	Uddevalla, Sweden	1988–1993; 1997–2013	Pioneered a new approach to automobile assembly	Custom		Worldwide
Uddevalla Plant; Auto Nova Plant (1995–2003); Pininfarina Sverige (2003–2013)	YV1	J	Uddevalla, Sweden	1988–1993; 1997–2013	Production halted in 1993	Custom		Worldwide
Uddevalla Plant; Auto Nova Plant (1995–2003); Pininfarina Sverige (2003–2013)	YV1	J	Uddevalla, Sweden	1988–1993; 1997–2013	Resumed production in 1997 as Auto Nova through a joint venture between Volvo Cars and Tom Walkinshaw Racing	Custom		Worldwide
Uddevalla Plant; Auto Nova Plant (1995–2003); Pininfarina Sverige (2003–2013)	YV1	J	Uddevalla, Sweden	1988–1993; 1997–2013	Became Pininfarina Sverige in 2003 through a joint venture between Volvo Cars and Pininfarina	Custom		Worldwide
Uddevalla Plant; Auto Nova Plant (1995–2003); Pininfarina Sverige (2003–2013)	YV1	J	Uddevalla, Sweden	1988–1993; 1997–2013	Shut down (2013)	Custom		Worldwide
Bengaluru Plant	YV1		Bengaluru, India	2007–present	First Volvo Car Assembly plant in India and joint venture with Ghent, Belgium	Assembly (2007–present); Manufacturing (2014–present)	XC40, S60, S90, XC60, XC90	India
Chengdu Plant; Zhongjia Automobile Manufacturing (Chengdu) (ZAMC)	LYV	B	Chengdu, China	2013–present	First Volvo Car plant in China	Manufacturing	S60, XC60, EX90, EX30	Worldwide
Daqing Plant; Daqing Volvo Car Manufacturing (DVCM)	LVY	P	Daqing, China	2014–present	Debut model: Volvo XC90 Classic	Manufacturing	S90, S90L	Worldwide
Daqing Plant; Daqing Volvo Car Manufacturing (DVCM)	LVY	P	Daqing, China	2014–present	Commenced S90 exports to Europe via rail network (2017)	Manufacturing	S90, S90L	Worldwide
Daqing Plant; Daqing Volvo Car Manufacturing (DVCM)	LVY	P	Daqing, China	2014–present	S90 worldwide production hub will shift from Torslanda to Daqing	Manufacturing	S90, S90L	Worldwide
Volvo Car Charleston Plant Volvo Car US Operations (VCCH)	7JR	G	Ridgeville, South Carolina, United States	2018–present	First Volvo Car plant in the United States	Manufacturing	EX90, Polestar 3	Worldwide
Volvo Car Charleston Plant Volvo Car US Operations (VCCH)	7JR	G	Ridgeville, South Carolina, United States	2018–present	Produced SPA-based S60 model	Manufacturing	EX90, Polestar 3	Worldwide
Luqiao Plant (CMA Super Factory); Zhejiang Kingkong Automobile Co. Ltd. (ZKA)			Luqiao, China	2019–present	Will produce CMA-based 40 series models	Manufacturing	XC40, Polestar 2	Worldwide
Luqiao Plant (CMA Super Factory); Zhejiang Kingkong Automobile Co. Ltd. (ZKA)			Luqiao, China	2019–present	First Lynk & Co plant	Manufacturing	XC40, Polestar 2	Worldwide
Polestar Plant	LPS	B	Chengdu, China	2019–2021	First Polestar plant	Manufacturing	Polestar 1	Worldwide
