= Polestar 5 =

Battery electric full-size luxury sedan

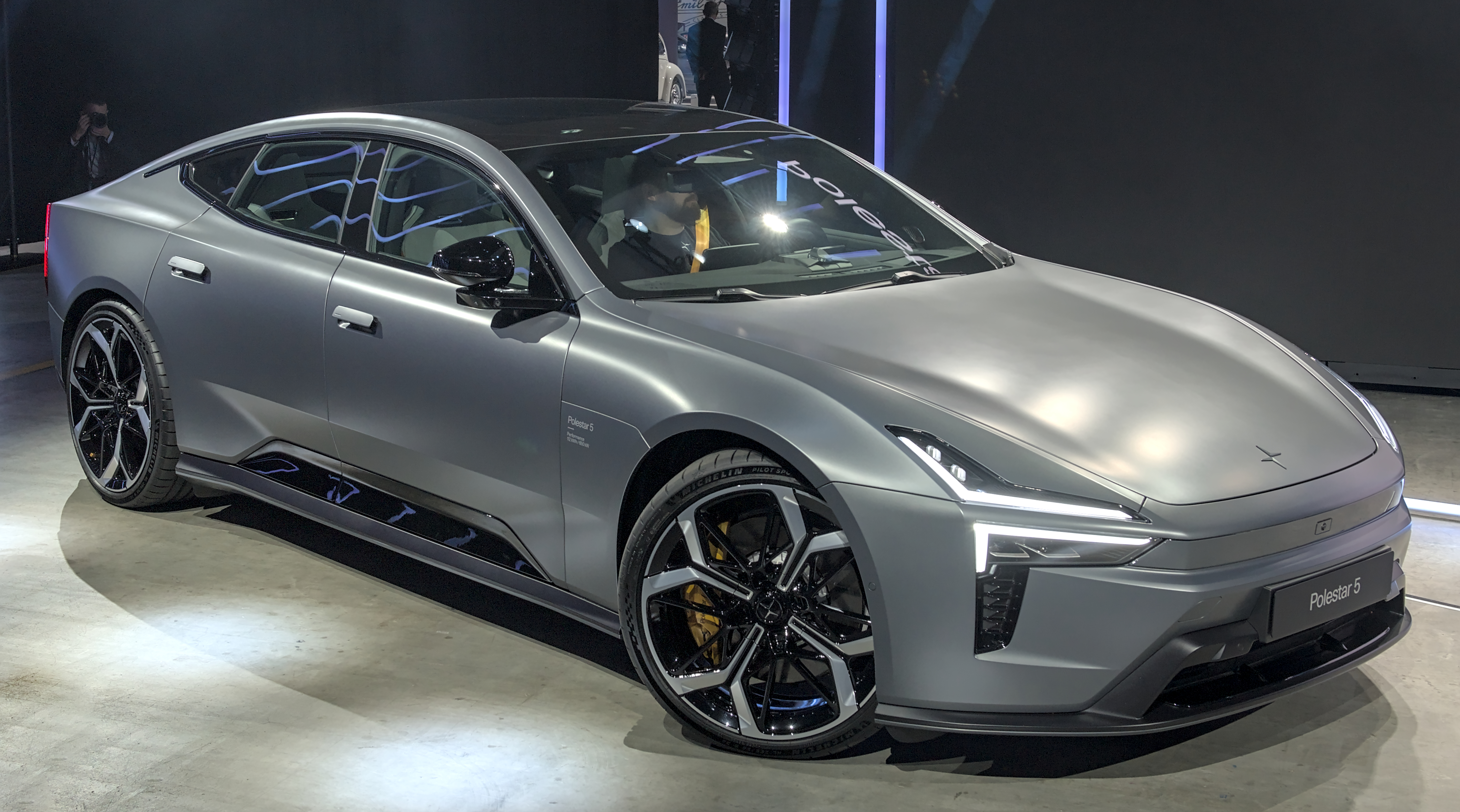

Overview
- Manufacturer: Polestar
- Production: 2026 (to commence)
- Assembly: China: Wuhan
- Designer: Nahum Escobedo

Body and chassis
- Class: Executive car (E)
- Body style: 5-door liftback
- Layout: Dual-motors, all-wheel-drive
- Platform: Polestar Performance Architecture (PPA)

Powertrain
- Electric motor: 2× Permanent Magnet Synchronous motors
- Power output: 650 kW (870 hp)
- Battery: 103 kWh

Dimensions
- Wheelbase: 3,054 mm (120.2 in)
- Length: 5,087 mm (200.3 in)
- Width: 2,015–2,063 mm (79.3–81.2 in)
- Height: 1,425–1,419 mm (56.1–55.9 in)
- Curb weight: 2,462–2,503 kg (5,428–5,518 lb)

The Polestar 5 is a battery electric executive liftback sedan produced by Swedish automobile manufacturer Polestar, an affiliate of Geely Holding and Volvo Cars. The Polestar 5 debuted at the 2025 Munich Motor Show and hit the European markets same year at a base price of 120 thousand euros.

== Overview ==
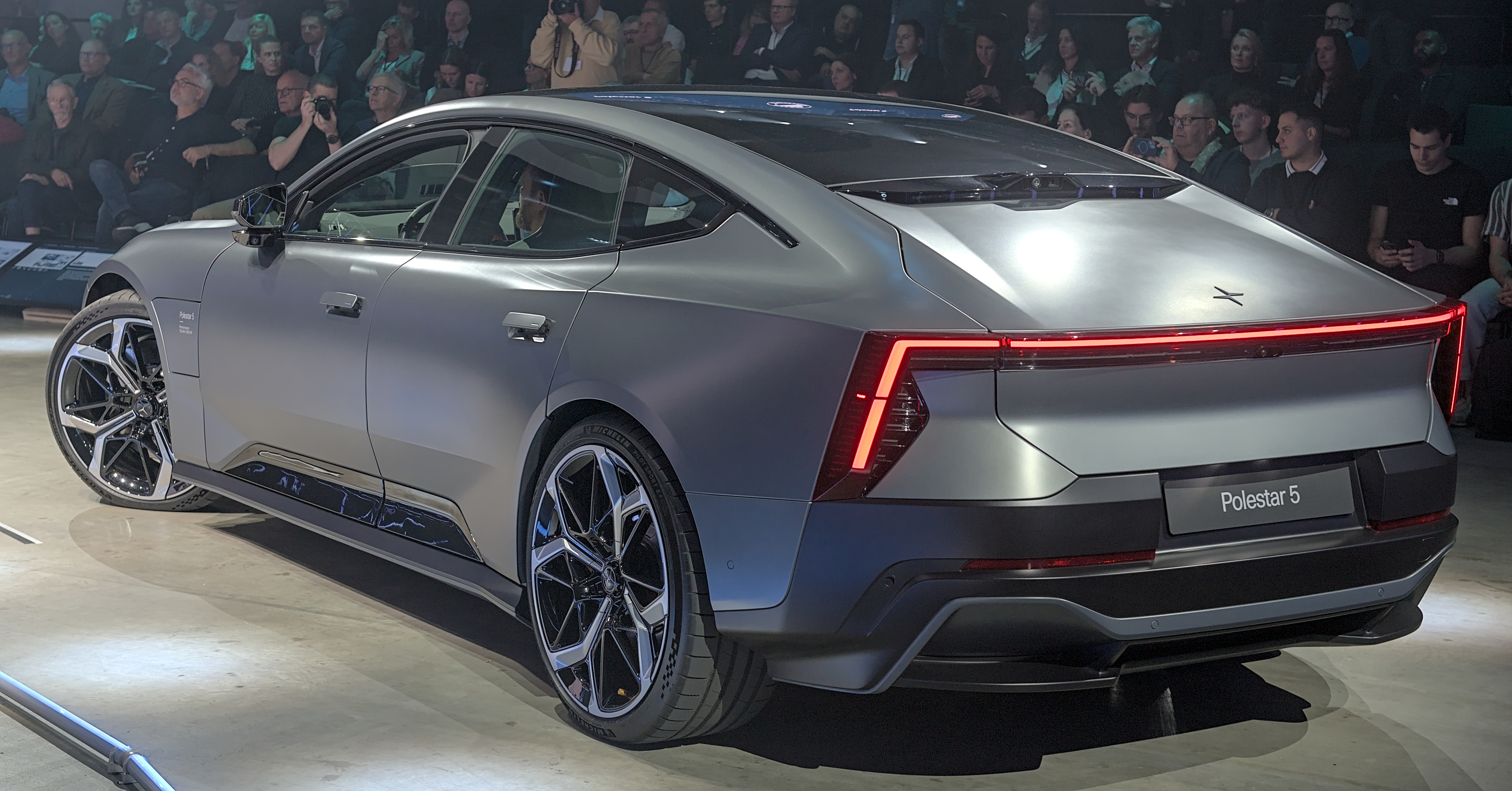
Rear view

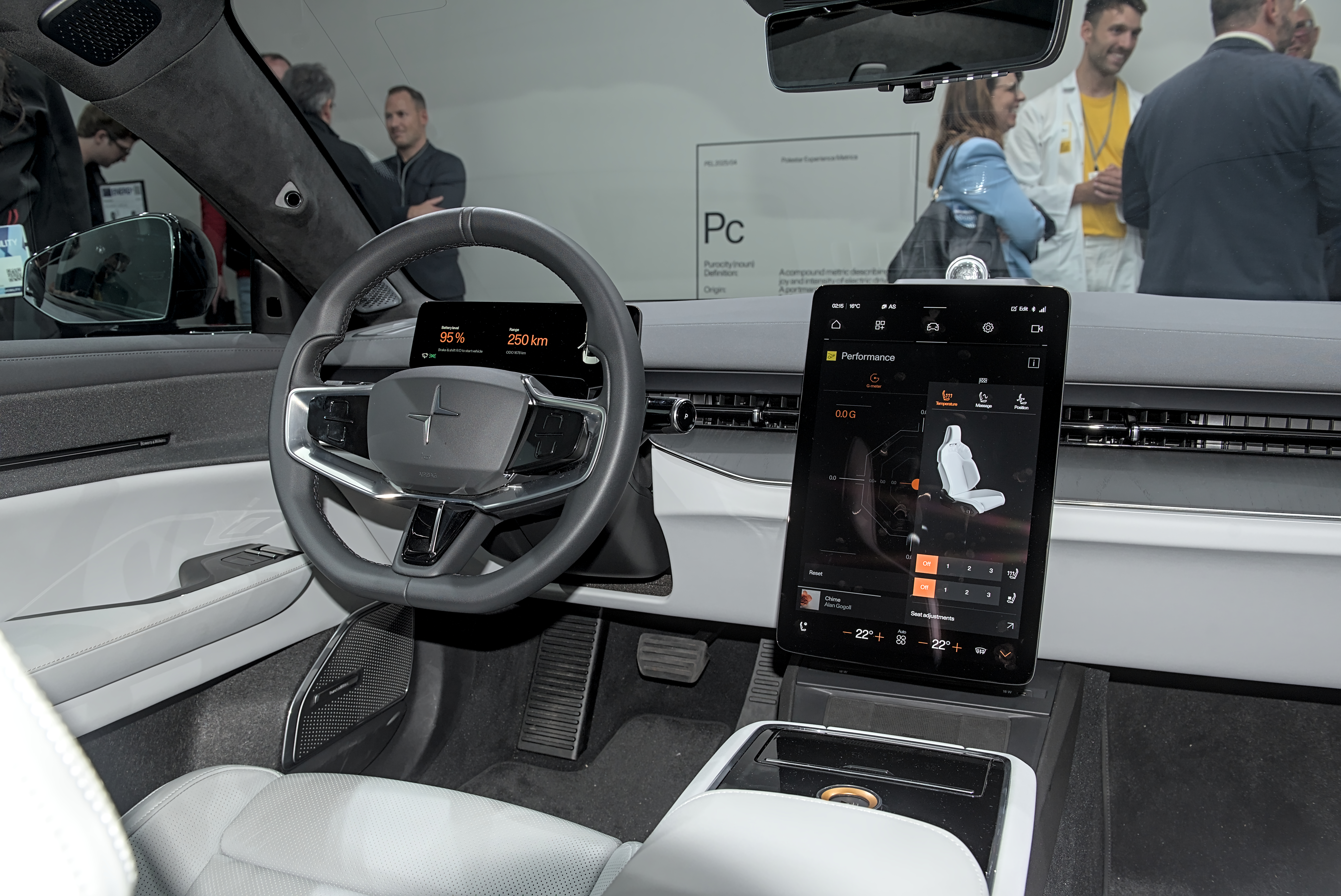
Interior

The Polestar 5 was first developed as the 2020 Polestar Precept concept car, and a prototype of the Polestar 5 was displayed in June 2022 at the Goodwood Festival of Speed.

The Polestar 5 will be built on the brand’s first bespoke EV architecture, developed by the Polestar UK R&D team. The body is made of bonded aluminum, while the interior features materials such as natural fiber composite deco panels made from flax fiber and 3D-knitted upholstery created from recycled PET. Both of these material choices have already made their production debuts in the Polestar 3 and Polestar 4.

== Specifications ==
The dual electric motor powertrain of the Polestar 5 will produce 650 kW (870 hp) and 1015 N⋅m (749 lb⋅ft) of torque. The vehicle will be equipped with an 800-volt battery developed and manufactured by SK On.
