= Winfried Vahland =

German business executive (born 1957)

- Born: April 1, 1957 (age 69); Beckum, Germany

Winfried Vahland (born 1 April 1957) is a German business executive. He was the chairman of the board and CEO at Škoda Auto, a wholly owned subsidiary of the Volkswagen Group. In 2024, Vahland became chairman of the board at Swedish-Chinese automaker Polestar.

== Biography ==
Vahland was born in Beckum, Germany. He graduated from Darmstadt Technical University, majoring in mechanical engineering and business administration (Diplom-Wirtschaftsingenieur). He participated in master's programme in business administration (MBA) at the General Motors Institute, Michigan, United States.

In 1984 Vahland began working as a project analyst of European investments at Adam Opel AG. In 1987 he became head of manufacturing strategy review at General Motors Europe.

In 1990 Vahland joined Audi AG as director of controlling. In 1993 he was assigned to Volkswagen AG as director of group controlling. Between 1995 and 1997 he was responsible for coordinating sales for the Volkswagen brand and the Volkswagen Group and additionally for Volkswagen brand sales in the Asia-Pacific region. Vahland was appointed as the finance executive director of Volkswagen Brazil in 1997. One year later, he became the company's vice president for finance and corporate strategy. He also took responsibility for the Argentine market.

In August 2002, he became a member of the board of directors at Škoda, where he was subsequently promoted to vice chairman of the board of directors one year later. In July 2005, he assumed the position of president and CEO of Volkswagen (China) Investment Company (subsidiary of Volkswagen Group China), as well as global vice president of Volkswagen AG. He was appointed executive vice president of Volkswagen AG the following year (July 2006). In September 2010, Vahland returned to Mladá Boleslav, and was appointed Škoda board chairman.

Vahland received honorary doctorate degrees from the University of Economics in Prague in January 2006 and from the Dalian University of Technology in July 2012. In 2006 he also received honorary citizenship of Changchun. Shanghai Tongji University appointed him advisory professor in November 2007. In 2012, Vahland became the first German to receive an honorary citizenship of Chengdu, China.

In 2015, Vahland was named head of North American division of Volkswagen, but subsequently resigned from the company two weeks after the appointment.
