= Polestar =

Swedish electric car brand

Polestar Automotive Holding UK PLC

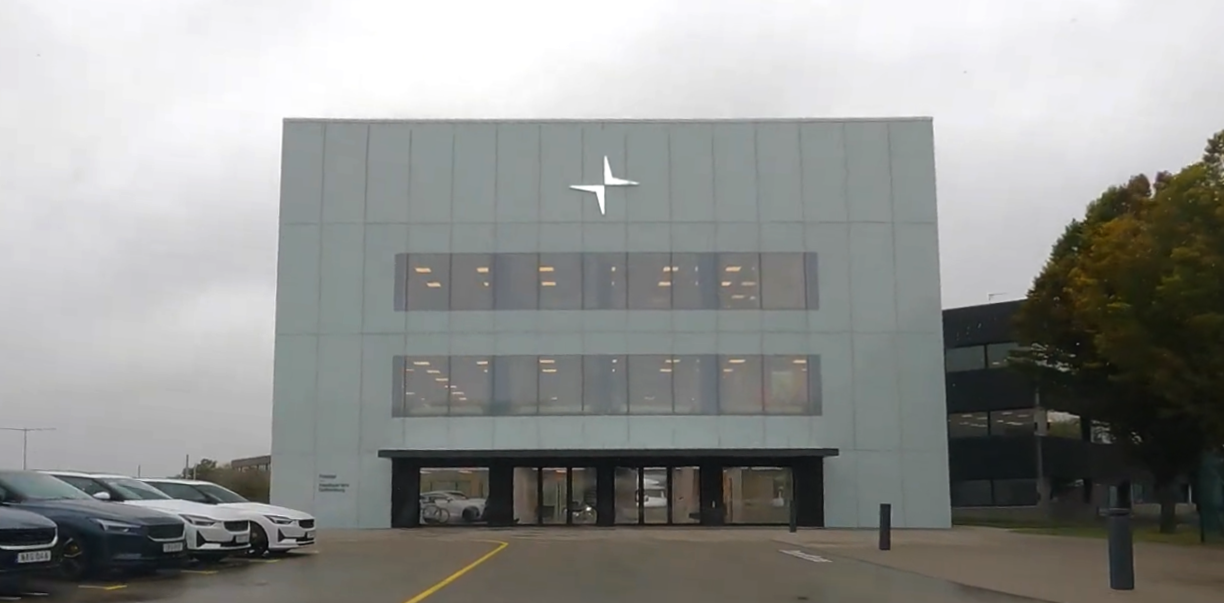
- Headquarters in Torslanda, Sweden
- Type: Public
- Traded as: Nasdaq: PSNY
- Founded: 2017; 9 years ago
- Headquarters: Torslanda, Sweden (operational); Bristol, England, UK (legal)
- Area served: Europe; China; United States (until 2026); Canada
- Key people: Michael Lohscheller (CEO); Winfried Vahland (chairman)
- Products: Electric vehicle
- Revenue: ▲US$3.06 billion (2025)
- Operating income: ▼ −US$2.01 billion (2025)
- Net income: ▼ −US$2.36 billion (2025)
- Total assets: ▼US$3.93 billion (2025)
- Total equity: ▼US$5.12 billion (2025)
- Owner: PSD Investment (Li Shufu) (44%); Geely Holding (22%); Volvo Cars (16%); Public shareholders (18%)
- Number of employees: 2,547 (2024)
- Website: polestar.com
- Footnotes; Financials as of December 31, 2025; References

Polestar
- Current owner: Volvo Cars
- Country: Sweden
- Introduced: 2005; 21 years ago
- Previous owners: Polestar Racing (2005–2015)

Polestar Automotive Holding UK PLC, or simply Polestar, is a Swedish automotive manufacturer that produces electric cars. Principally owned by Li Shufu's PSD Investment, Geely Holding and Volvo Cars, the company is headquartered in Torslanda, outside Gothenburg, Sweden. With an "asset-light" approach in development and manufacturing, Polestar does not have its own manufacturing facility; instead it produces cars in facilities controlled by Volvo or Geely in several countries, including China, the United States, and South Korea.

The brand originated from Flash Engineering, a Swedish motorsport team established in 1996 that competed in the Scandinavian Touring Car Championship. In 2005, the team was sold and renamed Polestar Racing, which later operated a production car tuning division called Polestar Performance AB. In July 2015, the Polestar brand was acquired by Volvo Cars, which repositioned the brand as an electric vehicle manufacturer since 2017. The racing team was then rebranded as Cyan Racing, while still maintaining close ties to Volvo.

The current United Kingdom-based holding company of Polestar, Polestar Automotive Holdings UK PLC was jointly formed in 2021 by Volvo Cars and Geely Holding Group. Polestar shares began trading on the Nasdaq exchange under the symbol PSNY on 24 June 2022.

== History ==
=== Racing team and tuning brand (1996–2017) ===
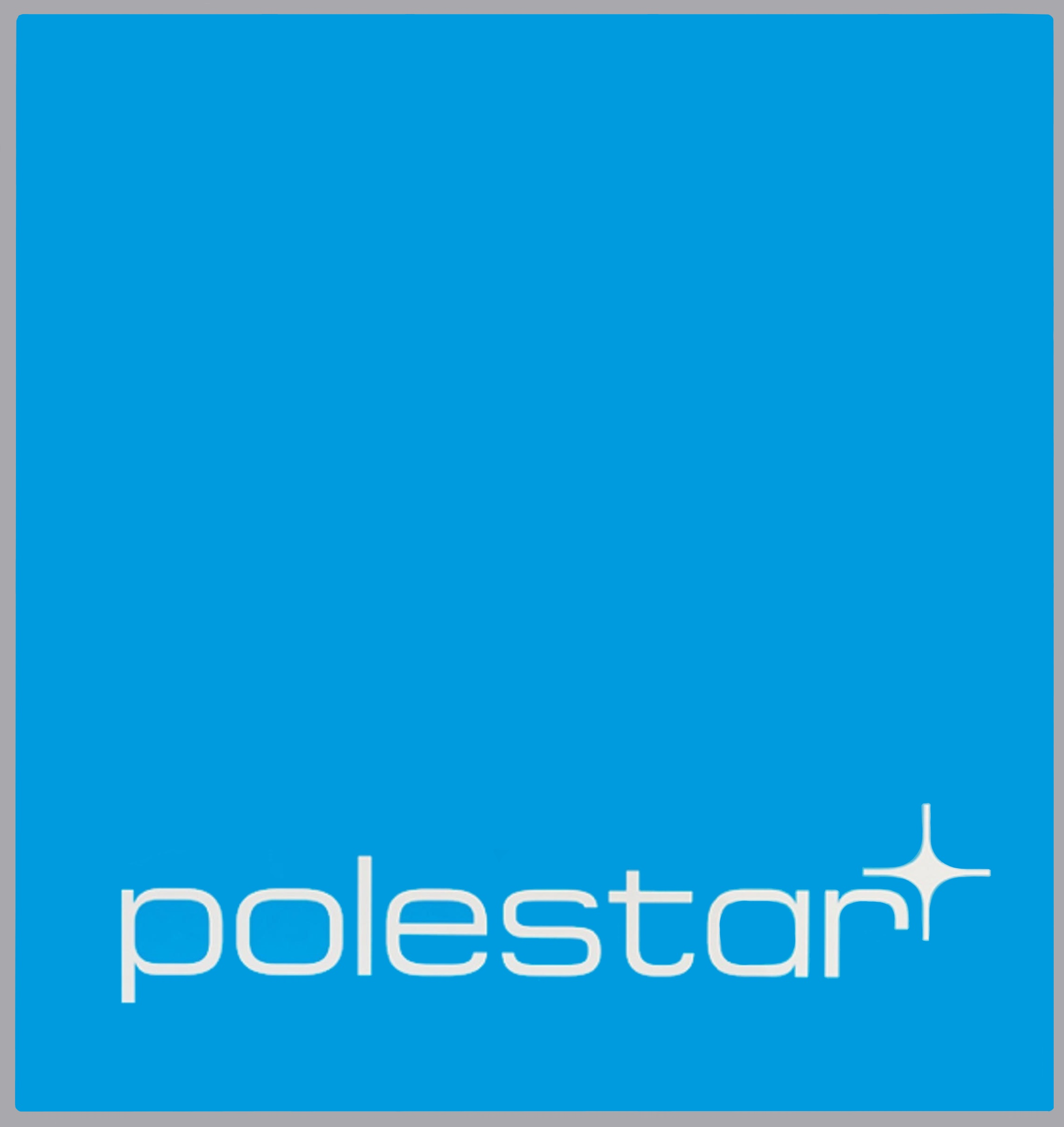
Polestar logo until 2016

The company origins can be traced to the 1996 foundation of Flash Engineering, a Swedish racing team competing in Swedish Touring Car Championship (STCC). The team was sold and rebranded as Polestar Racing, which began modifying Volvos for racing in the late 2000s. In 2009, the brand became the official Volvo partner to modify existing models, under the brand Polestar Performance. Volvo eventually bought the company in July 2015 and began selling Polestar-enhanced models directly through their resellers.

Polestar has also produced prototype cars, with the first being the C30 Polestar Performance Concept Prototype (2010) with over 400 bhp (300 kW) and 510 N⋅m (380 lbf⋅ft).

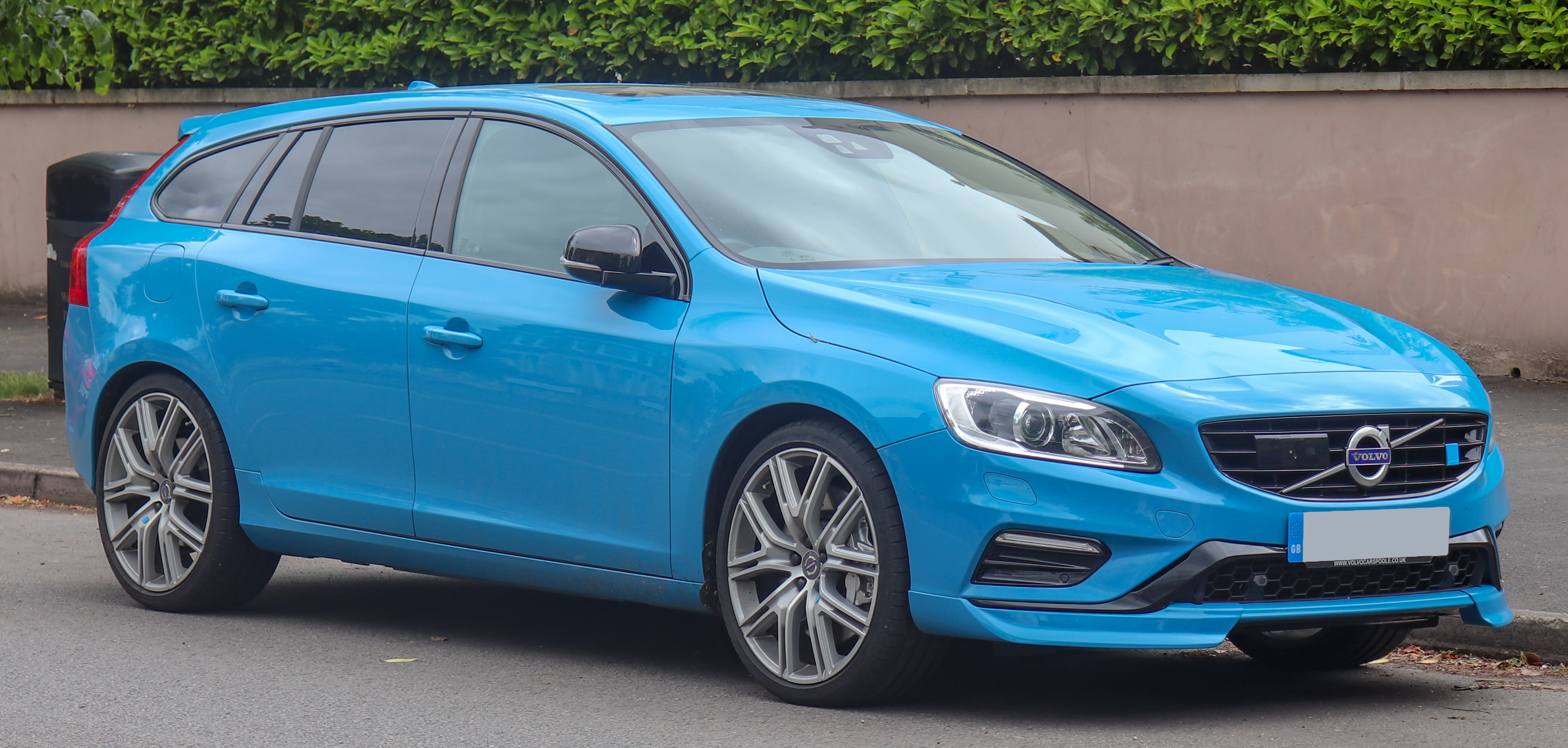
Volvo V60 Polestar

The Volvo S60 Polestar Concept is the heir to the C30 Polestar, featuring 508 BHP from a modified T6 engine, launched in June 2012. The car sprints from 0–100 km/h (0–62 mph) in 3.9 seconds with a top speed of over 300 km/h (190 mph). Motor Trend tested the car at Mazda Raceway Laguna Seca, where it broke the lap record for four-door cars, matching the lap time of an Audi R8.

Selection of petrol and hybrid powered Volvo-based Polestar models:

Introduced	Model	Type	Engine	Drivetrain
2009	Volvo C30 Polestar Concept	Concept	5-cylinder, 2500 cc, turbocharged, 451 PS	AWD, 6-speed manual
2012	Volvo S60 Polestar Concept	Concept	6-cylinder, 3000 cc, turbocharged, 508 PS	AWD, 6-speed manual
2013	Volvo S60/V60 Polestar	Production	6-cylinder, 3000 cc, turbocharged, 350 PS	AWD, 6-speed auto
2016	Volvo S60/V60 Polestar Drive-E	Production	4-cylinder, 1969 cc, turbocharged, 367 PS	AWD, 8-speed auto
2018	Volvo S60 T8 Polestar Engineered	Production	4-cylinder, 1969 cc, plug-in hybrid, 415 PS	AWD, 8-speed auto
2020	Volvo V60 T8 Polestar Engineered	Production	4-cylinder, 1969 cc, plug-in hybrid, 415 PS	AWD, 8-speed auto
2020	Volvo XC60 T8 Polestar Engineered	Production	4-cylinder, 1969 cc, plug-in hybrid, 415 PS	AWD, 8-speed auto

=== Standalone brand (2017–present) ===
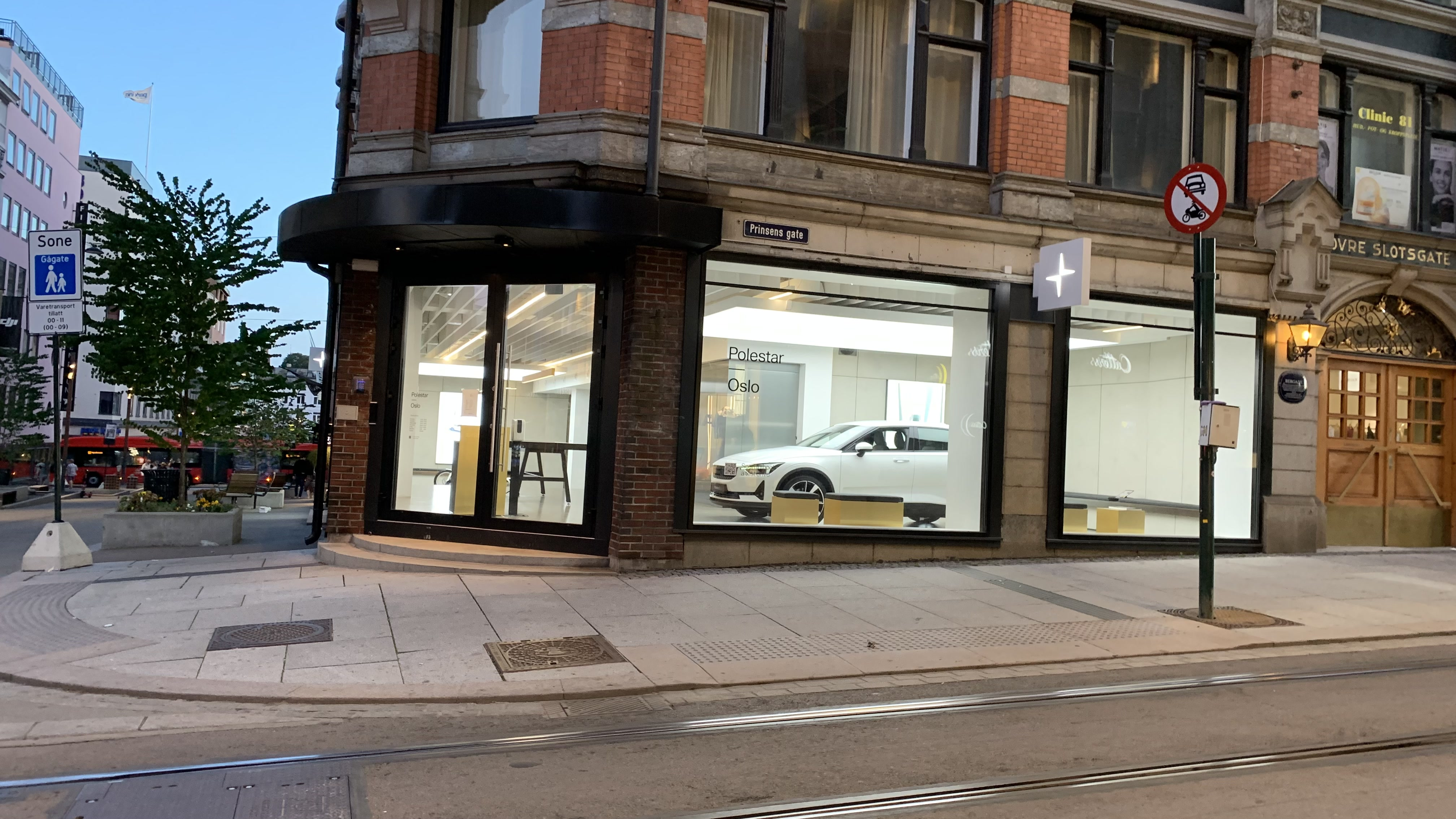
Polestar's showroom in Oslo, Norway

In October 2017, Volvo Cars and Geely Holding announced that Polestar would become a standalone brand focusing on electric cars. The brand introduced the Polestar 1 on 17 October 2017, a 2+2 coupé inspired by Volvo's Concept Coupé introduced in 2013, which includes influences from the Volvo P1800. The Polestar 1 was built between 2019 and 2021, and was built in a new purpose-built Polestar Production Centre in Chengdu, China, from 2019 at a rate of up to 500 per year. During its final year of production, a limited-production gold-painted version of Polestar 1 was released. Only 25 units were produced.

In 2019, Polestar announced their second car, the Polestar 2 electric car. It was unveiled on 27 February 2019, in an online unveiling which was broadcast from the Polestar headquarters in Gothenburg, Sweden. Directly after, it had its public debut at the 2019 Geneva Motor Show. It is produced at Volvo Cars's existing plant in Taizhou, China. It received a mid-life refresh for its 2024 year-model, switching to a rear-wheel drive layout for its single-motor option, and various performance and cosmetic changes for the base model and performance package, respectively. Polestar replaced the existing front grille with a body-color front-end treatment that houses new safety hardware, including a front-facing camera and a new mid-range radar, matching the Polestar 3, dubbed the "SmartZone".

In March 2022, Polestar launched a roadster concept named the Polestar O_{2}, and later in August 2022, Polestar announced a sixth new roadster model dubbed Polestar 6 based on the O_{2} concept car, expected to enter production in 2026.

In 2023, Polestar announced construction of its new headquarters – a 80,000 m^{2} (860,000 ft^{2}) building in central Gothenburg.

In February 2024, Volvo (itself 79.5% owned by Geely at the time) announced that it would attempt to reduce its ownership stake in Polestar from 48% to 18%, by transferring US$921 million of stock to its shareholders. This would result in PSD Investment (Geely founder Li Shufu's personal company) becoming the largest shareholder with at least a 39% stake. In April 2024, Geely Holdings became a major new shareholder, directly owning approximately 24% of Polestar. The free float also rose to about 18% of shares at that time, signifying that Volvo's February plan had been substantially realized.

In June 2025, Polestar announced a US$200 million equity investment by PSD Investment, an entity that is controlled by Li Shufu. Polestar sold more than 190 million Class A American depositary shares (ADS) to PSD Investment - which would make Li Shufu holds 44% of Polestar. The transaction would reduce Volvo Cars' stake in Polestar from 18% to 16%, with Geely and Li Shufu's stake increased to 66% combined.

In October 2025, Polestar closed its last direct-sales store in China, while the company said its other operations in China would be unaffected by the closure.

In June 2026, Polestar announced that it would be withdrawing from the United States market after the United States Department of Commerce Bureau of Industry and Security, citing a rule banning vehicles that use connected software and hardware associated with China and Russia, denied Polestar the right to sell new vehicles after the 2027 model year. The company stated that it would continue to service existing cars in the country.

== Corporate leadership ==
- Current:
- Winfried Vahland (Chairman since October 2024)
- Michael Lohscheller (Chief Executive Officer since 2024)

=== Previous leadship ===
- Thomas Ingenlath (Chief Executive Officer from 2017 to 2024)
- Håkan Samuelsson (Chairman from 2017 to 2024)

== Products ==
=== Current and future vehicles ===
Image	Name	Introduction (cal. year)	Platform	Powertrain	Vehicle description	Assembly location
	Polestar 2	2020	CMA	Battery electric	Compact executive car (D) with a 5-door liftback body style	China: Luqiao, Zhejiang (Luqiao CMA Super Factory)
	Polestar 3	2024	SPA2	Battery electric	Mid-size SUV (E), related to the Volvo EX90	China: Chengdu (Polestar Plant, 2024–2026); United States: Ridgeville, South Carolina (South Carolina Factory)
	Polestar 4	2024	SEA	Battery electric	Compact coupe SUV (D)	China: Ningbo; South Korea: Busan (Renault Korea, 2025)
	Polestar 5	2025	PPA	Battery electric	Mid-size sedan (E)	
	Polestar 6	2026 (planned)	SEA	Battery electric	Sports car	
	Polestar 7	2028 (planned)	SPA3	Battery electric	Compact SUV (D)	Slovakia: Košice

=== Discontinued vehicles ===
Image	Name(s)	Production (cal. year)	Platform	Powertrain	Vehicle description	Assembly location
	Polestar 1	2019–2022	SPA	Plug-in hybrid	Sports car / grand tourer, 1,500 units produced.	China: Chengdu (Polestar Plant)

=== Concept vehicles ===
- Polestar Precept
- Polestar O_{2}
- Polestar Formula 2030

=== Performance optimisation ===
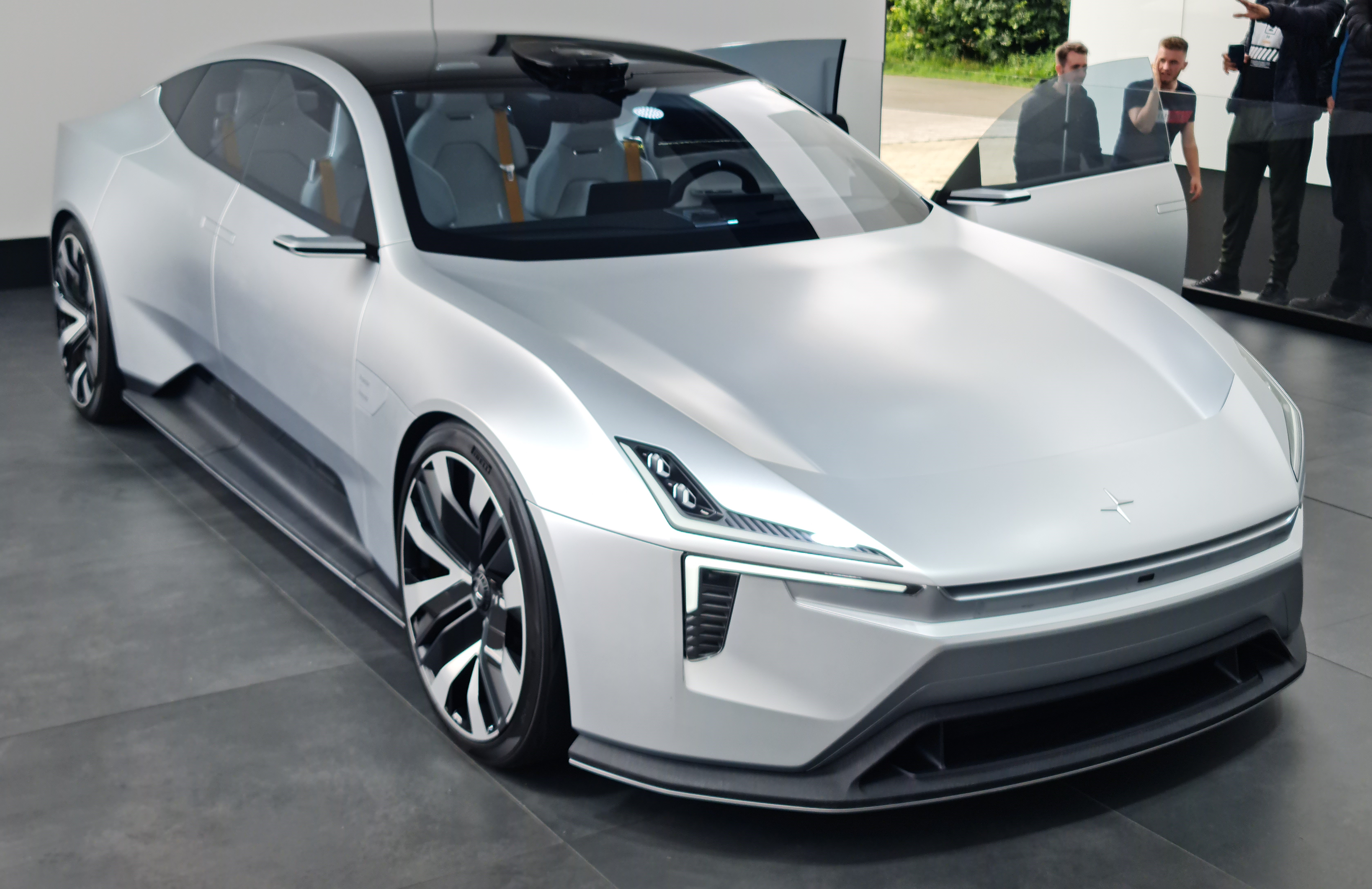
Polestar Precept

Under the label Polestar Engineered, Polestar offers enhancements for Volvo cars which deliver upgraded performance. Examples are engine optimizations with retained warranty and unchanged fuel consumption and emissions. The engine optimization increases the power and torque output, varying depending on engine model. The response of the throttle can be modified and the character of the transmission is tweaked.

In 2022, a special version of Polestar 2 was released as a Polestar Engineered product: the limited-production Polestar 2 BST edition 270, of which only 270 will exist.

== Finances ==
Since December 2023, Polestar is a publicly traded company trading under the symbol PSNY on the Nasdaq stock exchange.

Key figures:

Year	Revenue (mil. USD)	Net income (mil. USD)	Employees
2019	92	−198	
2020	610	−485	
2021	1,346	−969	1,300
2022	2,444	−477	2,377
2023	2,379	−1,195	2,515

== Racing ==
Polestar has been working with Volvo since 1996, starting with racing Volvo cars and being involved in the development of race cars for Cyan Racing. In 2014, Polestar was involved in the development of a V8 powered Volvo S60 that was raced by Garry Rogers Motorsport in the Australian V8 Supercars series. Robert Dahlgren was seconded to Australia in 2014 as part of this programme and pulled out in the end of 2016.

== Logo dispute in France ==
In 2019, French brand Citroën alleged that the Polestar company logo – also formed of chevrons – is too close to those of its Citroën and DS Automobiles brands. In the absence of an amicable agreement, Citroën took to the Tribunal de grande instance in July 2019. The latter, in a decision dated 4 June 2020, found in favor of the French manufacturer, a decision confirmed on appeal on 14 June 2020. As a result, from December 2021, Polestar vehicles cannot be purchased in France. In September 2022, it was reported that Citroën and Polestar had settled their dispute.

== Other ventures ==
In August 2022, the company announced it would supply batteries and charging hardware to Candela for electric boats that would "fly" on hydrofoils.
