= Strack =

Strack is a German language surname. Notable people with the surname include:

- Adriano Strack (born 1992), Brazilian football player
- Charles Strack (1899–1967), American wrestler
- Clara Strack (born 2005), American basketball player
- Danny Strack (born 1979), American poet
- Dave Strack (1923–2014), American basketball coach
- Dieter Strack (born 1950), German basketball player
- Friedrich Strack (1781–1852), German naturalist
- Fritz Strack (born 1950), German psychologist
- Gerd Strack (1955–2020), German football player
- Günter Strack (1929–1999), German actor
- Hermann Strack (1848–1922), German theologian
- Heinrich Strack (1805–1880), German architect
- Mae Woughter Strack (d. 1941), American nurse and artist
- Marian Estelle Melson Strack (1898–1974), American socialite and antisemite

== See also ==
- Stracke
