= Ernst Küster =

German botanist

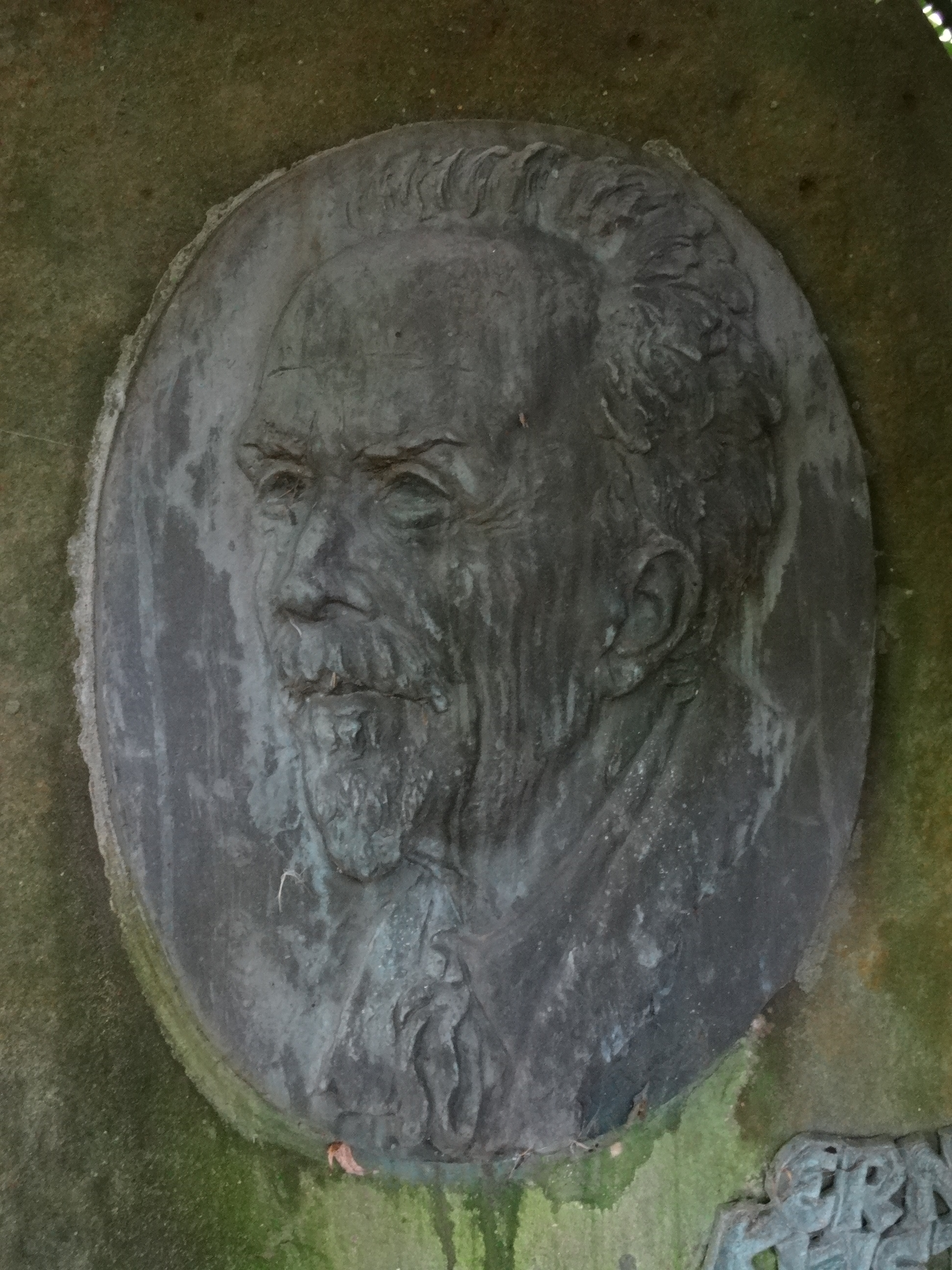
Ernst Küster

Ernst Küster (18 June 1874, in Breslau – 6 July 1953, in Gießen) was a German botanist known for his work in plant cell research.

In 1896, he obtained his doctorate from the Ludwig-Maximilians-Universität München under the sponsorship of Ludwig Radlkofer (1829–1927). After a few years of scientific travel, he served as an assistant to Georg Albrecht Klebs (1857–1918) at the University of Halle. In 1900, he received his habilitation with the thesis Beiträge zur Anatomie der Gallen. From 1909 to 1911, he worked with Johannes Reinke (1849–1931) at Kiel University, becoming an associate professor in 1910. Afterwards he worked with Eduard Strasburger (1844–1912) at the University of Bonn, and in 1920 succeeded Adolph Hansen (1851–1920) as director of the botanical institute at the University of Giessen.

Küster made important contributions in his research involving the physiological and chemical processes associated with plant cells. He is remembered for his investigations of plasmolysis and the morphology of plant protoplasm. From 1903 to 1951 he was editor of the "Zeitschrift für wissenschaftliche Mikroskopie" (magazine dedicated to scientific microscopy).

== Principal works ==
- Pathologische Pflanzenanatomie, 1903
- Die Pflanzenzelle. Vorlesungen über normale und pathologische Zytomorphologie und Zytogenese, 1935, 1951—Lessons on normal and pathological cytomorphology and cytogenetics.
- Pathologie der Pflanzenzelle, 1937–39.
  - Works by Küster that have translated into English:
- "Pathological plant anatomy", 1903
- "Contribution to the Process of Leaf Fall", 1967
- "Pathology of the plant cell": Part 1, 1975
- "Pathology of Protoplasm (Pathology of the Plant Cell, Part 1)", 1996.
