= Michael Lohscheller =

German manager

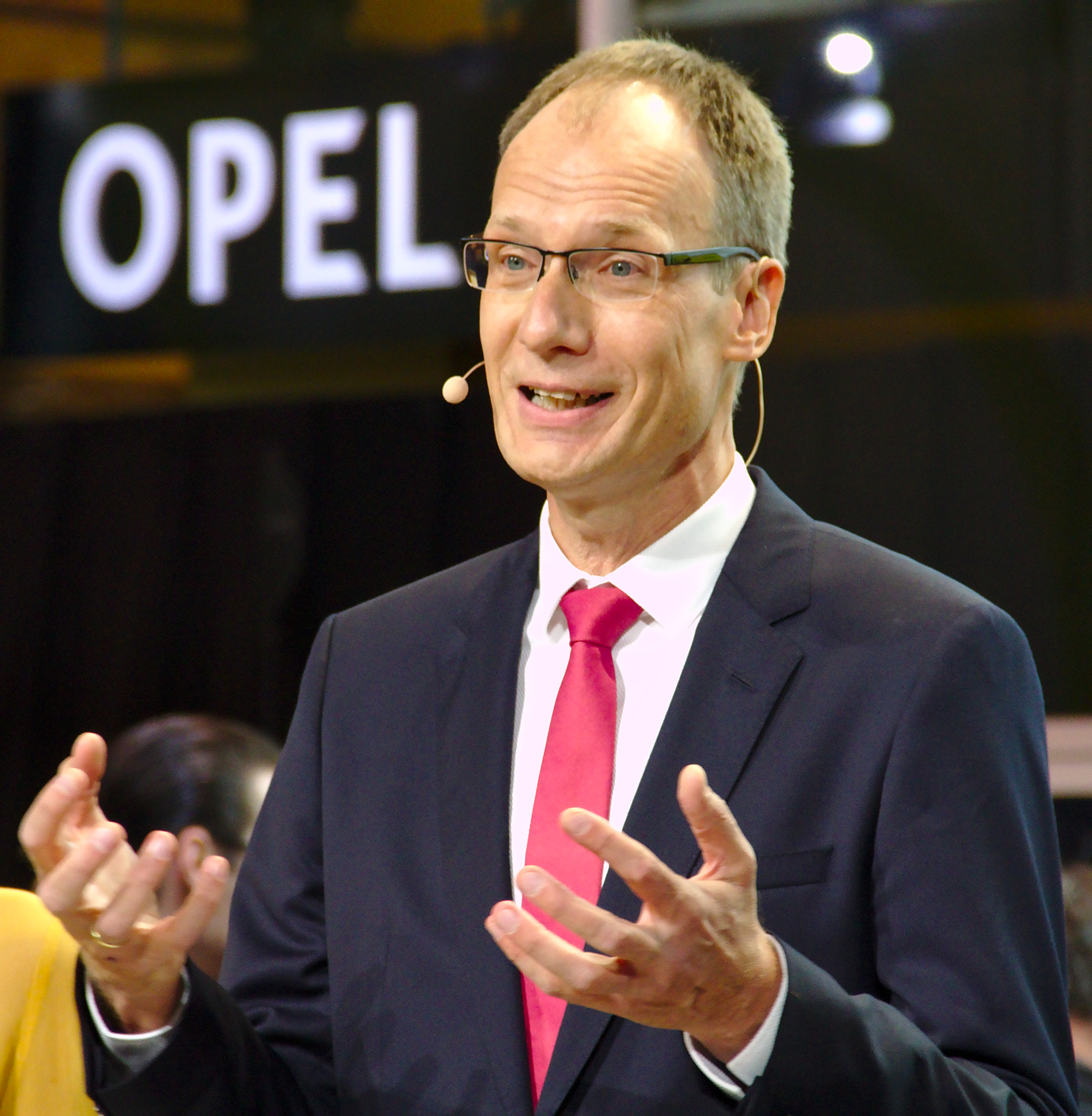
- Michael Lohscheller at IAA 2019
- Born: November 12, 1968 (age 57); Bocholt, Borken, Münster, North Rhine-Westphalia, Germany
- Citizenship: Germany
- Education: Hochschule Osnabrück, University of Barcelona, Brunel University London (MA)
- Employer(s): Jungheinrich, Adtranz, Mitsubishi Motors, Volkswagen Group, Volkswagen Group of America, Opel, VinFast, Nikola, Polestar
- Known for: Management control system, CFO, CEO
- Children: 2

Michael Lohscheller (born November 12, 1968) is a German businessman. Since October 2024, he is the CEO of Swedish automotive manufacturer Polestar.

He previously worked as financial controller for Jungheinrich, CFO at Mitsubishi Motors, CFO at Volkswagen Group, CEO at Opel and then VinFast.

== Early life and education ==
Lohscheller graduated from Osnabrück University of Applied Sciences (Germany) and the University of Barcelona (Spain) in 1992. During his working years, Michael Lohscheller completed a Master’s Program in European Marketing Management and obtained his M.A. at Brunel University London in 1996.

== Working ==
Lohscheller began his career in 1992, working as a controller at Jungheinrich AG., then at DaimlerChrysler.

In 2001, he transferred to Mitsubishi Motors and rose to be CFO. In 2004, he started as director of group marketing and sales control at Volkswagen AG. After four years, he assumed the position of CFO of Volkswagen Group USA.

In 2012 Lohscheller moved to Adam Opel AG, where he became a board member. In June 2017, he was promoted to chief executive officer of the car manufacturer, now transformed into Opel Automobile GmbH, succeeding Karl-Thomas Neumann. Mid-July 2021 he announced his departure from Opel to pursue a career outside the Stellantis group. His immediate successor at Opel was Uwe Hochgeschurtz, previously the head of Renault Germany, Austria and Switzerland.

In 2019, he received the Award Eurostar 2019 Magazine Automobile Automotive News Europe, Awards MANBEST 2019 was selected by the Jury of the Organization AUTOBEST and League Manager of the Year 2019 Magazine Autozeitung.

In July 2021, Vietnam's Vingroup announced that Lohscheller would become the chief executive officer of the Vinfast car brand and be responsible for marketing the brand globally. In late December he stepped down from his position.

In February 2022, Lohscheller was appointed President of Nikola Motor. In August 2023 it was announced that he would be stepping down due to a family health matter.

On August 28, 2024, Polestar announced the appointment of Michael Lohscheller as CEO, effective October 1, 2024, succeeding Thomas Ingenlath. Lohscheller, with a background in leading automotive companies such as Opel, VinFast, and Nikola, is set to guide Polestar through its next growth phase as the company aims to expand its global presence in the premium electric vehicle market.

== Personal life ==
Lohscheller had two children and is interested in Marathon running.

== See also ==
- Robert Stempel Managing Director Adam Opel AG 1980–1982
- Louis R. Hughes
- Carl-Peter Forster chairman and managing director of Adam Opel AG 2001–2009
- Karl-Friedrich Stracke Chief Executive Officer of Adam Opel AG
