= Ludwig Jungermann =

German physician and botanist

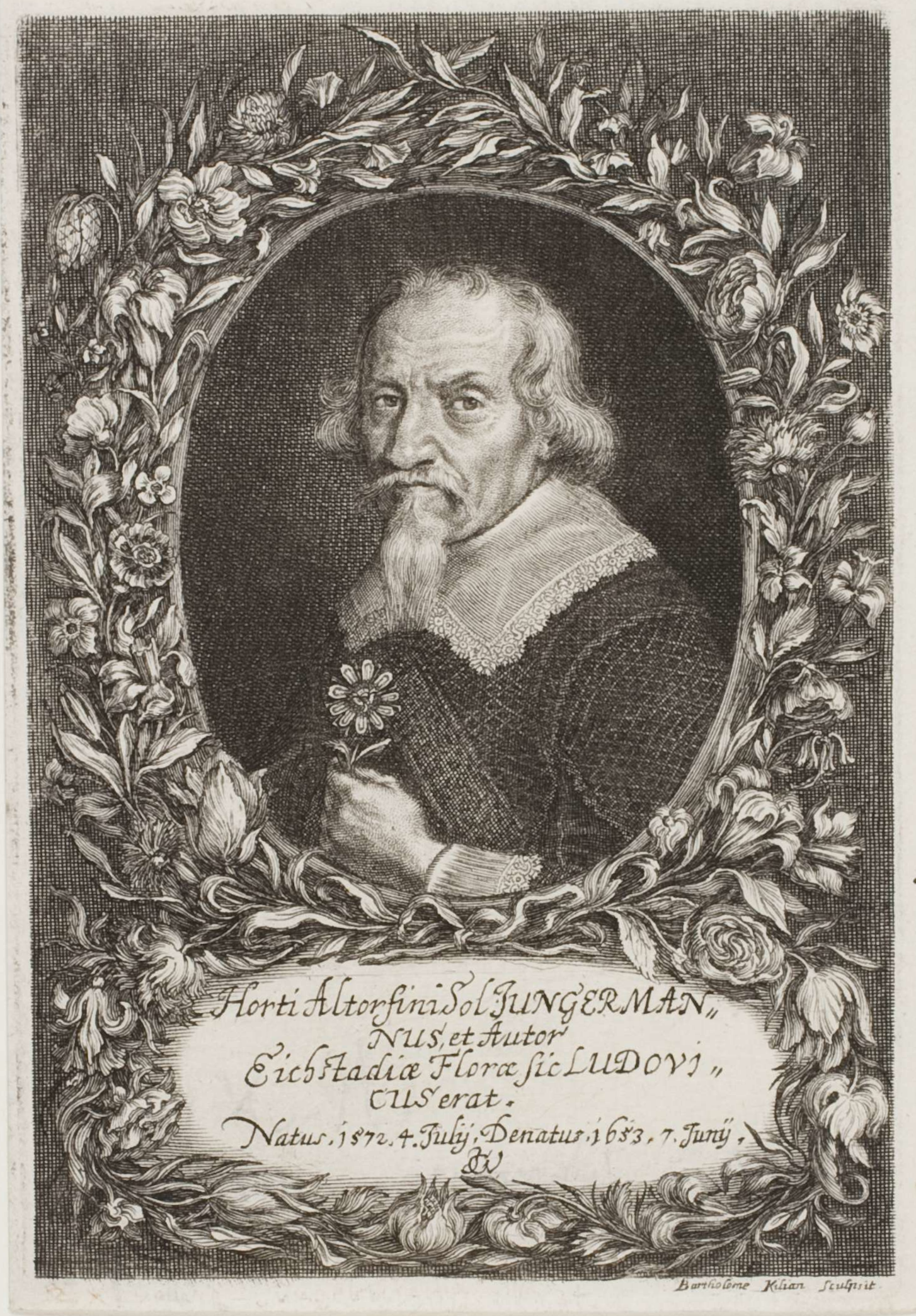
Ludwig Jungermann

Ludwig Jungermann (4 July 1572 – 7 June 1653) was a German botanist and physician. He worked as a professor of botany at the University of Giessen where he established a medical-botanical garden. He later worked in Altdorf, studying plants.

== Biography ==
Jungermann was born in Leipzig where his father Caspar Jungermann (1531–1606) was a professor of law at the university. His mother Ursula Camerarius (1539–1604) was the daughter of the humanist Joachim Camerarius the Elder (1500-1574), a colleague and friend of Philipp Melanchthon. He studied medicine at Jena, Altdorf and Giessen, receiving his degree in 1609. He first lived in Nuremberg and then became professor of anatomy and botany in Giessen from 1614 to 1625. In 1616 he refused an appointment to the renowned Chair of Botany in London as successor to Matthias Lobelius, just as he had not followed previous appointments to the Universities of Rostock and Rinteln.

In Gießen he laid out the botanical garden (Hortus medicus). Today it is the oldest botanical garden in Germany, still standing in its original location. In 1625 he accepted a professorship for anatomy and botany at the University of Altdorf in Altdorf. There he also headed the Hortus medicus. Jungermann was the first botanist to publish local floren. A flora from Altdorf was published in 1615. His flora from Giessen, Cornucopiae Florae Giessensis and the Catalogus herbarum circa Giessam (both from 1623) are lost today.

In addition to the two floras, he published the Hortus Eystettensis together with Basilius Besler in Nuremberg as early as 1613. Jungermann was already regarded by his contemporaries as "vir botanicorum nemini secundus". He is said to have noticed that he would only marry when he was brought a plant that he could not identify. He died unmarried.

Heinrich Bernhard Ruppius named the genus Jungermannia from the plant family Jungermanniaceae in his honour. Carl von Linné later adopted this name.
