= Jesko =

Jesko or Jesco is a male given name, which is used among Slavs and in Germany. It is a short form of Jaromir or Jaroslaw and may mean "the peaceful one", "the brave one", "the proud one" or "the soldierly one".

There may be a link with the name of Polish ruler Mieszko I.

Like many traditional names ending with -ko such as Aiko, the name Jesko is somewhat associated with the gentry in Germany, but also used by other families. It is popular in the "von Puttkamer" family. Because it is an old name it is used in the more traditional minded population and is rare among the general population.

Notable people with the name include:

- Jesko Friedrich (born 1974), German comedic television actor and writer
- Jesco von Puttkamer (1933–2012), German-American aerospace engineer and senior NASA manager
- Jesco von Puttkamer (diplomat) (1919–1987), German publicist and diplomat
- Jesco von Puttkamer (general) (1876–1959), German lieutenant general
- Jesco von Puttkamer (journalist) (1903–1969), German journalist and propagandist
- Jesco von Puttkamer (politician) (1841–1918), German lawyer and politician
- Jesco von Puttkamer (writer) (1858–1916), German journalist and writer
- Jesko von Puttkamer (1855–1917), German diplomat, colonial administrator, and military officer
- Jesko Raffin (born 1996), Swiss motorcycle racer
- Jesco White (born 1956), American folk dancer and entertainer
- Jesco Wirthgen (born 1977), German actor and voice actor
- Karl-Jesko von Puttkamer (1900–1981), German admiral and naval adjutant to Adolf Hitler

Notable people with the surname include:

- Bill Jesko (1915–1961), American basketball player
- Jackie Jesko, American film director, producer, and journalist

== See also ==
- Koenigsegg Jesko, a mid-engine sports car produced by Swedish automobile manufacturer Koenigsegg.
