= Gummiinsel =

Estate in Giessen, Germany

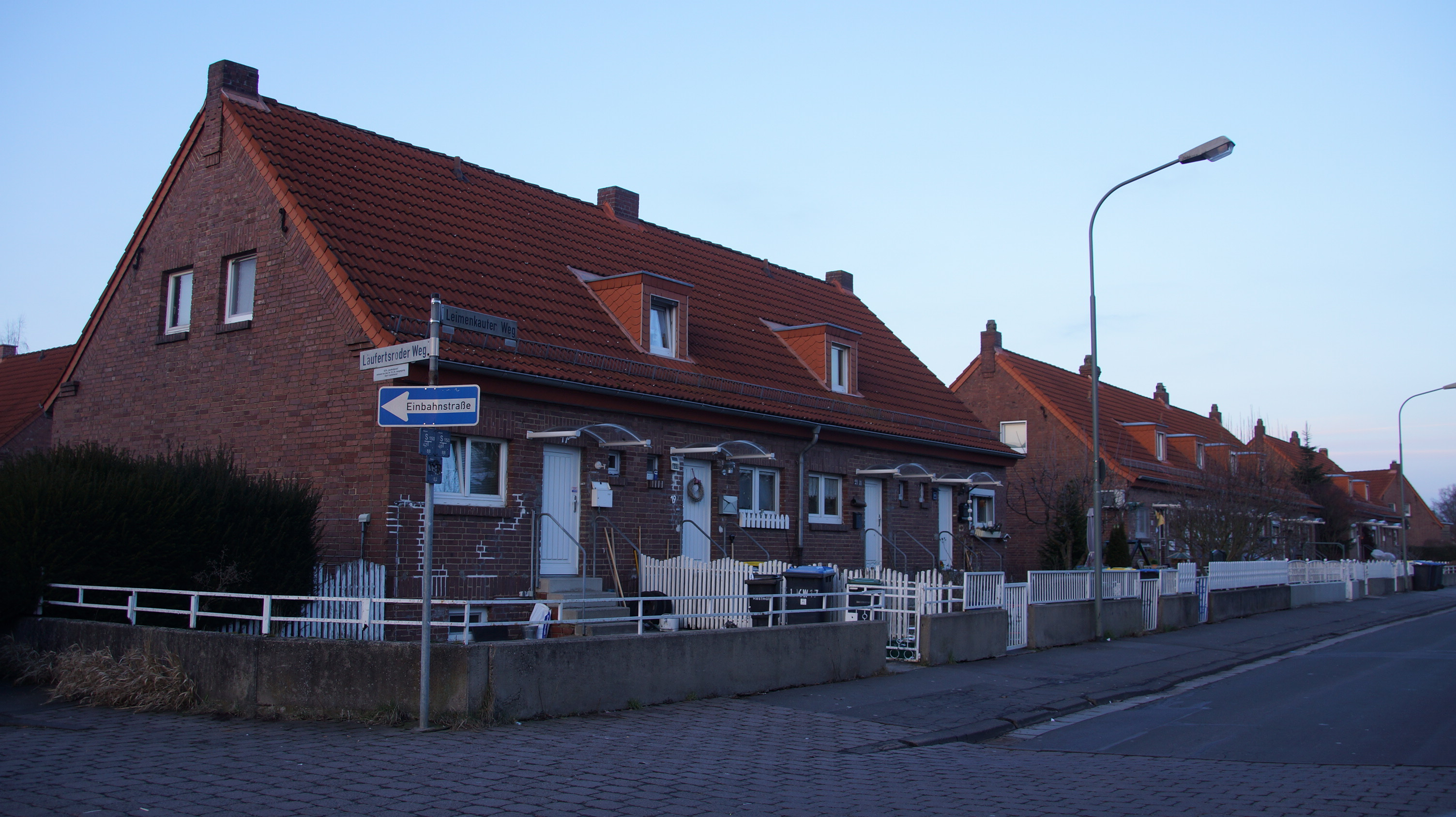
The Rubber Island in Gießen. Corner of Läufertsröderweg and Leimenkauterweg

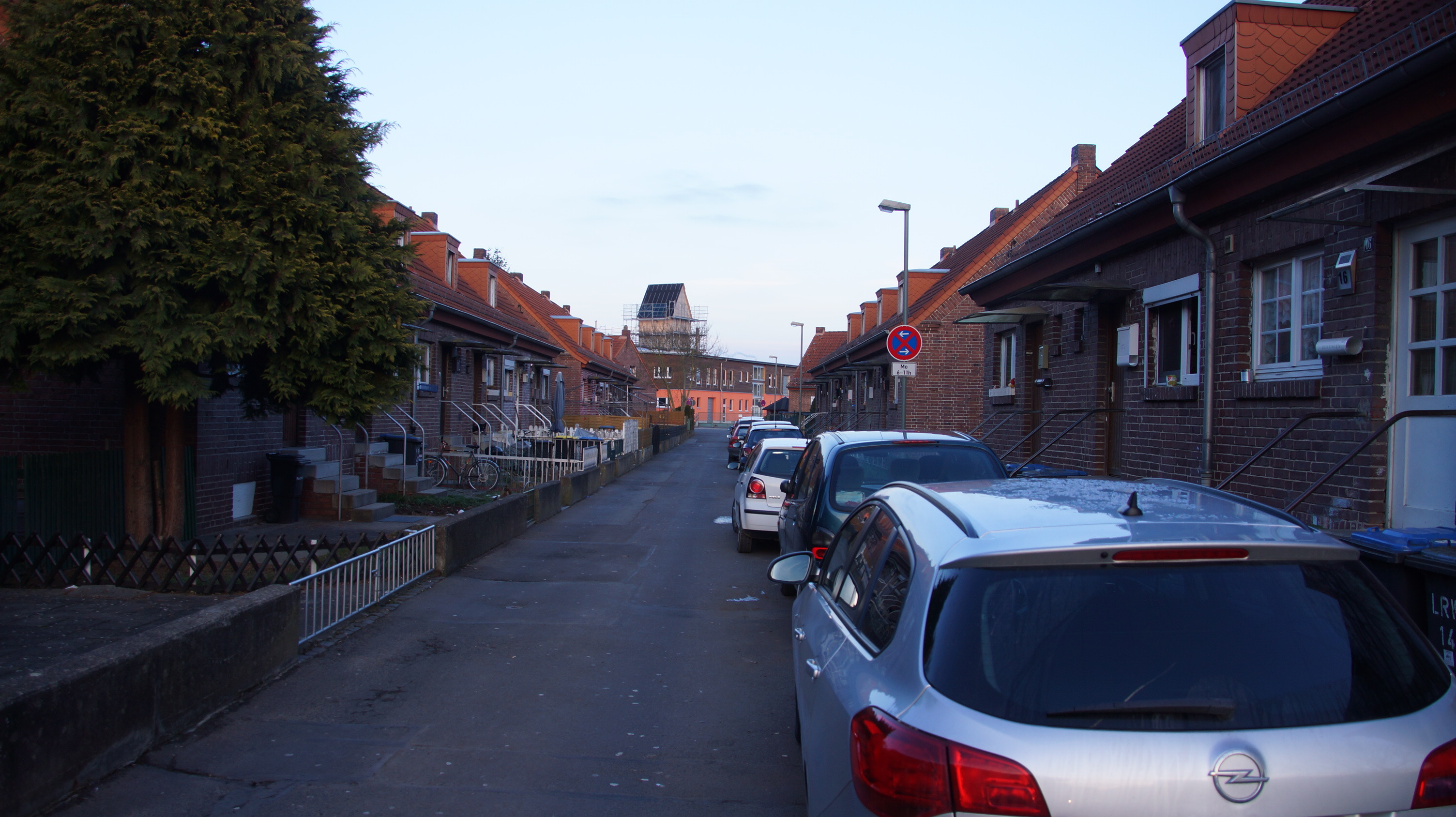
The Rubber Island in Gießen. Brick buildings in the Läufertsröderweg

Gummiinsel (German for Rubber Island) is the nickname of a residential estate in the western part of Giessen (Germany), so-called because of its location close to the rubber factory Poppe & Co., and also because of a history of flooding from the nearby Lahn river. It lies on the opposite side of the Lahn from the rest of the city, and stands out by its distinctive building style.

== Location ==
The Gummiinsel was built 1932-39 as part of the Nazi Siedlungspolitik, a programme of relocating parts of the urban populations in highly organized self-suffient suburban communities. The homes were small two-storey red brick houses with no basement, each with a small front yard. They were built within a concept similar to council houses as emergency shelters, especially for families of Yenish tradesmen, showmen, scrap merchants, second-hand dealers and descendants of regional Sinti families.

Later these houses have been renovated, partially demolished, replaced by high-rise public housing and the residential area to the west city expanded. As far as they still exist, they are now in possession of the municipal-private housing company, Wohnbau Gießen GmbH.

== Sociology ==
The Gummiinsel was and still is regarded as a social focal point. The name of the neighbourhood had a disparaging tone. The population structure of the area is still (as of 31 December 2012) characterized by a high concentration of low-income and socially disadvantaged households and by a great ethnic diversity. The percentage of children is higher than in other parts of the town. The proportion of households living on benefits is very high. Due to the elimination of jobs in the manufacturing sector for the people in the western city there are few chances of employment. For part of the person concerned, this means permanent unemployment and persistent chronic poverty. In recent times, there was an increased influx of families with a migration background. This has intensified integration and tolerance problems between traditional incumbent poverty, substandard poverty and new immigrant groups.

Under the influence of the student movement there emerged citizens' groups, who took care of the misery in this remote district, and offered especially support to the many large families. Community work in the area and extensive building renovations defused the social focus. Since the early 1970s the city tried to apply counter measures to the continued threat of isolation and impoverishment.

== Language ==
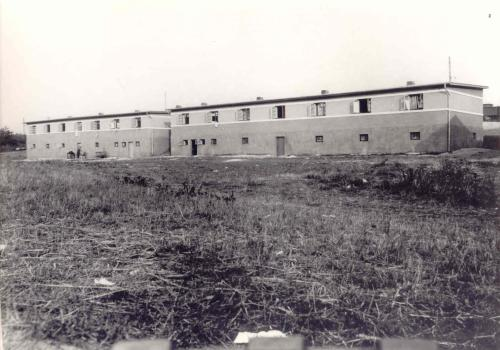
Margaretenhütte, approx. 1930

Residents of Gummiinsel spoke, at least until the 1980s, an unusual dialect within the traditional neighborhood including the close-by estates Margaretenhütte (Henriette-Fürth-Straße) and Eulenkopf ("Owl Head"): It was a Sociolect based on Manisch and Romani language. Today the Manisch slang exists only in relics and the cant or cryptolect (i.e. secret language) has nearly disappeared.
