= Stracke =

Stracke is a German surname. Notable people with the surname include:

- Gustav Stracke (1887–1943), German astronomer
- Karl-Friedrich Stracke (born 1956), German engineer
- Stephan Stracke (born 1974), German politician
- Win Stracke (1908–1991), American musician

== See also ==
- 1019 Strackea, asteroid named after Gustav
