= Botanischer Garten Gießen =

Botanical garden in Gießen, Germany

Coordinates: 50°35′10″N 8°40′44″E

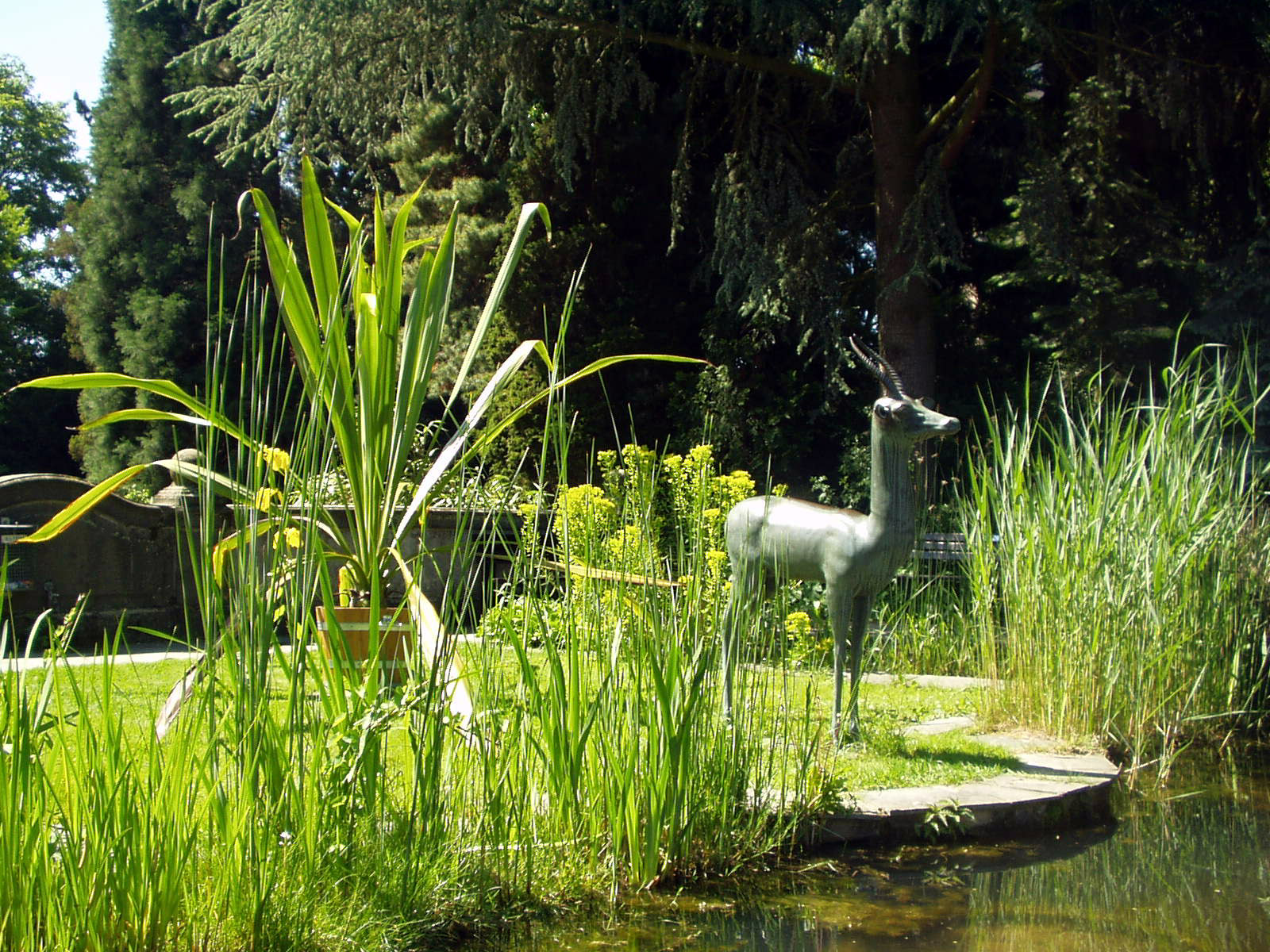
Botanischer Garten Gießen

The Botanischer Garten Gießen (4 hectares), more formally the Botanischer Garten der Justus-Liebig-Universität Gießen, is a historic botanical garden maintained by the University of Giessen. It is the oldest botanical garden in Germany still at its original site, with an entrance at Senckenbergstraße 6, Gießen, Hesse, Germany. It is open daily without charge.

The garden was founded in 1609 when Louis V, Landgrave of Hesse-Darmstadt, donated part of the palace garden to his newly established university for cultivation as a hortus medicus, following the earlier creation of such gardens at Leipzig (1580), Heidelberg (1597) and Eichstätt (1600). Physician and botanist Ludwig Jungermann (1572–1653) laid out the garden over an area of 1200 m^{2}. The garden fell into decay during the Thirty Years' War (1618–1648), but in 1699 the construction of a coldhouse for frost-sensitive plants was recorded, and in 1720 its first glasshouse was built (subsequently demolished in 1859). By 1773 the garden was described as a botanical garden rather than hortus medicus.

In 1802 the university's new forestry garden was established adjacent to the botanical garden by Friedrich Ludwig Walther (1759–1824). In 1805, when the city's fortress wall was torn down, the resultant space was incorporated into the garden; its remnants are still present under an artificial hill. Garden director Johann Bernhard Wilbrand united the botanical and forestry gardens, at which time the garden reached its present area. When the forestry garden was then moved in 1825 to today's site at the Akademischer Forstgarten Gießen, its magnificent trees remained as part of the botanical garden. The garden was rearranged in 1891 to reflect a systematic organization, and in the early 1900s a large tropical house was constructed. The tropical house was destroyed in World War II, and the garden itself severely damaged. The garden has now been thoroughly restored.

Today the garden contains around 8,000 species of plants, primarily for research use by students of botany, agronomy, geography, medicine, and veterinary medicine.

== See also ==
- Akademischer Forstgarten Gießen
- List of botanical gardens in Germany
