= Akademischer Forstgarten Gießen =

Historic arboretum and botanical garden in Hesse, Germany

Coordinates: 50°33′26″N 8°42′51″E

- Interactive map of Akademischer Forstgarten Gießen
- Type: Arboretum and botanical garden
- Location: Schiffenberger Weg, Schiffenberger Wald, Gießen, Hesse, Germany
- Area: 5.7 hectares (14 acres)
- Opened: 1825
- Founder: Karl von Gall
- Operator: University of Giessen
- Open: Daily, free admission
- Species: 200+ tree and shrub species

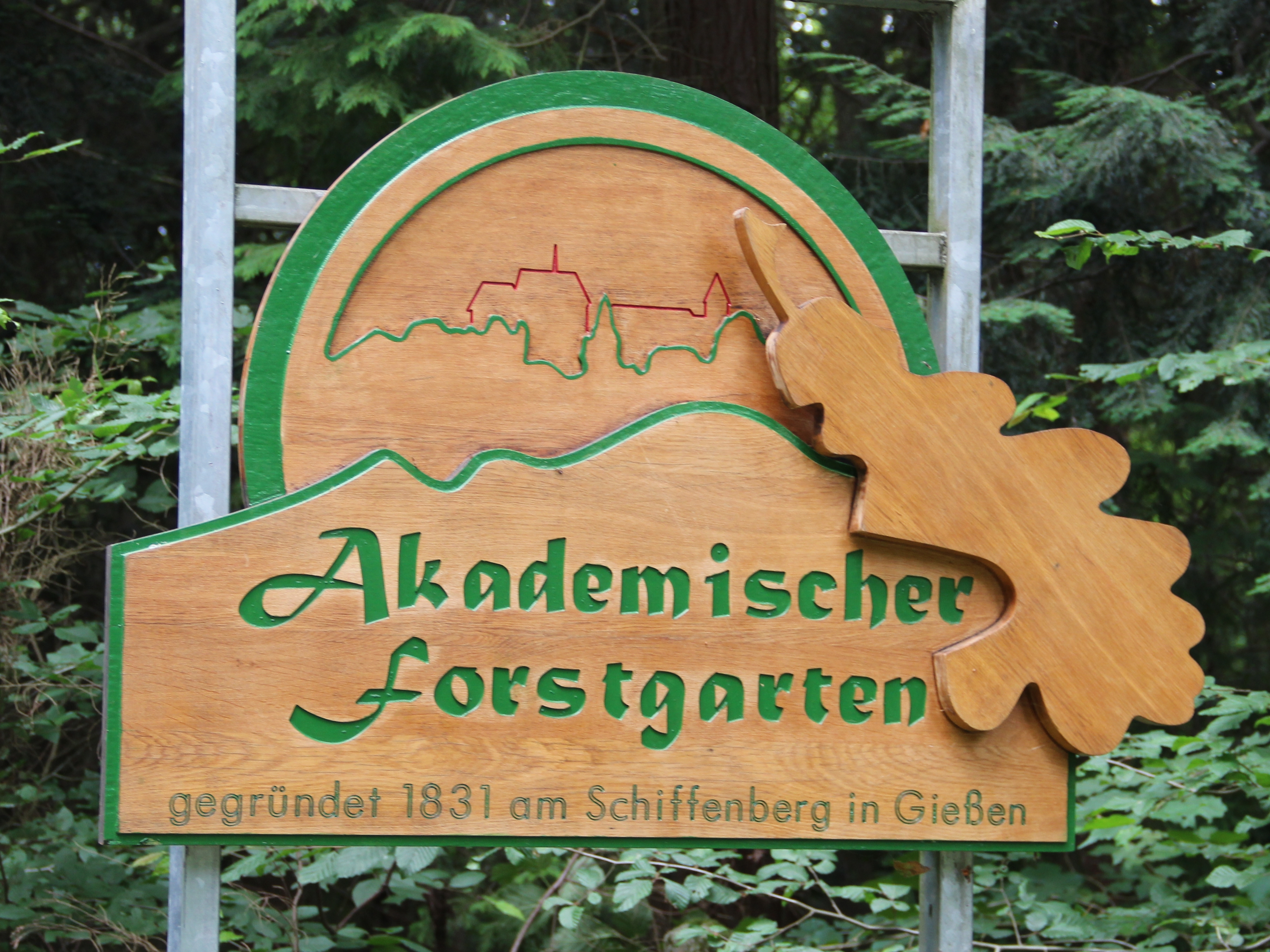
Sign of the garden

The Akademischer Forstgarten Gießen is a historic arboretum and botanical garden in the Schiffenberger Wald on Schiffenberger Weg, Gießen, Hesse, Germany. It opens daily with free admission.

The garden dates to 1778, when the University of Giessen added a career in forestry, making it the oldest department of this kind in the world. Its first forest garden was founded in 1802.

In 1825, the forester official Karl von Gall created today's garden on an area of 0.5 hectares (1.2 acres), which by 1830 contained "close to 400 varieties of forest plants" including many foreign trees.

The Hessian Forest College was founded in 1825, and merged into the University of Giessen in 1831.

Carl Justus Heyer, who directed the garden from 1830–31 and 1835–1856, was also responsible for the Botanischer Garten Gießen. By 1877 the forest garden had been extended to 5.7 hectares (14 acres) and it was enlarged again in 1883.

In 1938, the Forest Institute was relocated to the University of Göttingen, and the Akademischer Forstgarten Gießen fell into disuse. Today it still contains more than 200 tree and shrub species.

== See also ==
- List of botanical gardens in Germany
