= Henrietta Skelton =

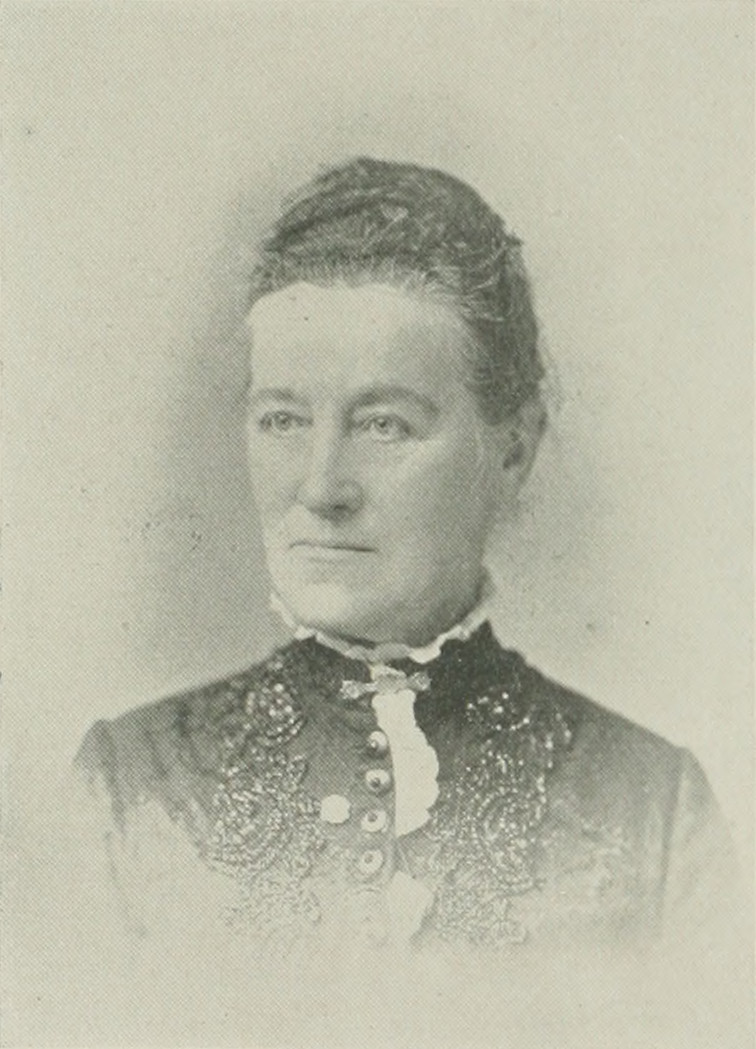
- Photo in A Woman of the Century
- Born: Henrietta Hedderich; November 5, 1839; Giessen, Germany
- Died: August 22, 1900 (aged 57); Pacific Grove, California
- Occupations: Author, Social reformer, Organizer, Lecturer
- Spouse: Mr. Skelton (died 1874)

Henrietta Skelton (née, Hedderich; pen names, H. S.; Madame Skelton; November 5, 1839/1842 – August 22, 1900) was a 19th-century German-born Canadian-American social reformer, writer, organizer, and lecturer in the German Spanish, and English languages. She was the superintendent of the German work for the National Woman's Christian Temperance Union (NWCTU), and president of the State Union of Idaho, In that capacity, she traveled all over the United States, lecturing in English and German, and leaving behind her local unions of well-organized women. Skelton's name was known by thousands of German citizens of the United States as one of the most dedicated workers in the temperance movement. For a time, she edited the temperance paper known as Der Bahnbrecher, besides writing several books published in the English language, including The Man-Trap (Toronto), a temperance story; Clara Burton (Cincinnati), a story for girls; and The Christmas Tree (Cincinnati), a description of domestic life in Germany.

== Early years ==
Henrietta (sometimes spelled Henneriette) Hedderich was born in Giessen, Germany, November 5, 1839. (Note: According to Willard & Livermore (1893), she was born November 5, 1842.) Her father was a professor in the University of Giessen. Her first four years were spent playing with two sisters and three brothers. When she was five, two brothers and a sister died within a brief period. About the same time, Professor Hedderich was elected to one of the principal professorships in the University of Heidelberg There, in a Froebel kindergarten, Skelton began her studies.

When Skelton turned sixteen, her father died, and her mother did so, too, six months later. An uncle received Skelton as a legacy from the dying mother, and, after settling up the family affairs, removed his charge and her brother to his home in Canada.

== Career ==
At the age of eighteen, she married an Englishman, Mr. Skelton, who was a traffic superintendent of the Northern Railway. The marriage was a happy one. After thirteen years of marriage, on the husband's death-bed, Skelton dedicated herself to the temperance movement, a cause that had been important to the couple. He died in their home in Toronto, Canada, in 1874. At his death, the widow had nothing left but their son. Soon after, the son, showing signs of pulmonary disease, accompanied his mother to southern California, hoping to find health.

Shortly after, Skelton entered the lecture field, where she promptly earned the reputation of being a persuasive orator. So soon as the Prohibition party was proposed, Skelton became involved in the movement. Skelton devoted herself to the cause of the WCTU, with which for years, during her residence in Canada, she had been closely identified. Her dedication to reform was recognized early on by the national executive board of the WCTU, and she was appointed one of its national organizers. In that capacity, she traveled all over the United States, lecturing in both English and German, and leaving behind her local unions of well-organized women.

German citizens of the United States knew her as one of the most dedicated workers in the cause of temperance. For a time, she conducted the temperance paper known as Der Bahnbrecher (The Pioneer), Skelton's most popular books were Eastertide, A Man Trap, The Fatal Inheritance, Home Life in Canada, The Christmas Tree, Lily Orme, and Grace Morton. Almost every reader of poetry in that day was familiar with her poem, "If I Should Die To-night", and the hymn, "Pray Without Ceasing".

== Personal life ==
After her son died in 1882, at age twenty-four, her greatest hopes were then pinned on her young grandson. In 1883 or earlier, Skelton was a patient at the Sanitarium at Battle Creek, Michigan. She

In Germany, Skelton lived in Giessen, Darmstadt, and Heidelberg. In Canada, she lived in Toronto (1857-1877). In the United States, she resided in Ohio (1880); Michigan (1880); Illinois (1883); California (1883-); Idaho (1886-1887); and finally in Pacific Grove, California where she died in Pacific Grove, California, August 22, 1900.

== Selected works ==
- Alice, or, The rose of the Black Forest , 1867
- Grace Morton, 1873 (by Madame Skelton)
- Die Verhängnissvolle Erbschaft, 1882 (by H. S.)
- A man trap; and, the fatal inheritance : two temperance tales, 1876
- Clara Burton
- The Christmas-tree : a story of German domestic life, 1882
- Ralph Berrien, and other tales of the French Revolution
