= Jungheinrich =

German material handling company based in Hamburg

Jungheinrich AG
- Type: Aktiengesellschaft
- Traded as: FWB: JUN3; MDAX
- ISIN: DE0006219934
- Industry: Intralogistics, Mechanical engineering
- Founded: 7 August 1953
- Headquarters: Hamburg, Germany
- Key people: Dr. Lars Brzoska, CEO
- Products: Forklift truck
- Revenue: €5.502 billion (2025)
- Net income: 176,000,000 euro (2018)
- Number of employees: 21,438 (2025)
- Website: jungheinrich.com

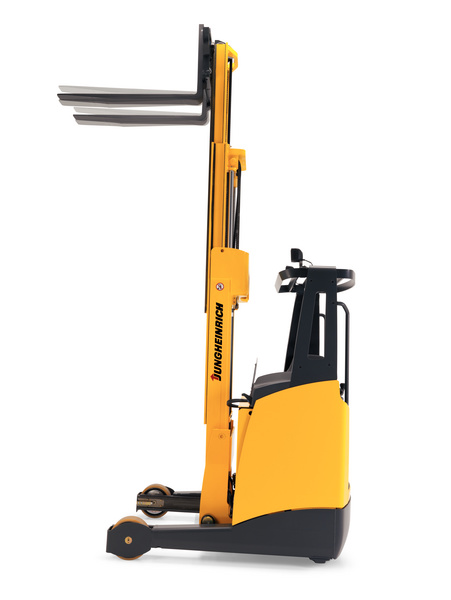
ETV214

Jungheinrich AG is a German company active in the material handling equipment, warehousing and material flow engineering sectors. In these segments, the company is ranked in second place in Europe, and third in the world.

== History ==
Friedrich Jungheinrich founded H. Jungheinrich & Co. Maschinenfabrik on 7 August 1953 in Hamburg. The first foreign branch was opened in Austria in 1956. In 1958, the company headquarters opened with a plant in Hamburg-Wandsbek. On 11 July 1960 Jungheinrich AG was founded as a Swiss subsidiary under the name "Ameise GmbH", headquartered in Aarau.

A site in Friedrichsgabe in today's Norderstedt was acquired in 1966 and production was gradually relocated from Hamburg to this site until 1984. The company founder Friedrich Jungheinrich died on 28 January 1968. In 1974, the rental and used truck business started with its own organization. The new plant in Lüneburg was built in 1989. The first Eastern European branches were established in the Czech Republic and Hungary in 1991. In 1994, Jungheinrich acquired the Steinbock und Boss Group. The production facilities in France, Great Britain and Spain were closed and production was relocated to Germany. In 2002, the Group brands MIC, Steinbock and Boss were abandoned and since then, trucks have only been sold under the Jungheinrich brand name. The Dr. Friedrich Jungheinrich Foundation was established in 2004 to promote scholarships for students specialized in mechanical engineering or industrial engineering. In 2005, the company presented the world's first forklift with a rotating cab.

In 2006, an assembly plant opened in Qingpu near Shanghai, China. Electric pedestrian-controlled pallet trucks are assembled here. The manufactured low-platform and high-platform trucks are used to supply Jungheinrich's sales operations in China and the Asian market. Also in 2006, the Dresden Used Equipment Centre for the reconditioning of used trucks commenced operations. In 2009, Jungheinrich started the production of battery-powered low-platform trucks at its new plant in Landsberg in Saxony-Anhalt. In 2013, a plant for warehouse and system trucks was inaugurated in Moosburg an der Isar, the new central warehouse for spare parts in Kaltenkirchen and the new plant for industrial trucks for the Asia-Pacific region in Qingpu. At the beginning of October 2015, a new spare parts warehouse went into operation at the Kuzayevo site near Moscow.

This is operated by logistics service provider Kühne + Nagel Contract Logistics and is intended to supply not only Jungheinrich customers in Russia, but also in its neighboring states, with spare parts. At the end of 2015, the company also took over the Munich-based MIAS Group, which specializes in mechanical engineering in warehouse logistics. On 1 July 2015 Jungheinrich also expanded the Board of Management to include the Logistics Systems Division under Klaus-Dieter Rosenbach. In 2021, Jungheinrich generated sales revenue of 4.24 billion euros with 19,103 employees. The head office is located in Hamburg-Wandsbek, where the company moved into its own new building at the beginning of 2016. Its design was created by the Hamburg architects Prof. Klaus Sill & Assoziierte, with MBN Bau AG, Georgsmarienhütte, as general contractor, carrying out the construction work.

In 2025, Jungheinrich generated revenue of €5.502 billion and employed 21,438 people.

== Stock exchange listing ==
In 1990, the domestic companies merged and subsequently traded as a joint stock company, which went public with preference shares and was listed for the first time on 30 August 1990. The ordinary shares, and thus the entrepreneurial control, still remain with the families of the two daughters of the company founder. Until 3 December 2014 the Jungheinrich share was a component of the SDAX. With effect from 4 December 2014 the share was listed in the MDAX. On 24 September 2018 it switched back to the SDAX.

== Products and services ==
The product range is divided into four pillars: Firstly, industrial trucks such as forklift trucks, high-bay stackers and tractors. The best-known product is the ‘Ameise’ (Ant). It is a registered trademark of Jungheinrich Profishop and is frequently used as a synonym for manual or electric pallet trucks. The company now also produces driverless transport systems. Secondly, Jungheinrich implements rack systems. These are divided into manual, semi-automatic and automatic storage systems. Examples are automatic high-bay warehouses (HRL), automatic small parts warehouses (AKL), pallet warehouses and combined systems. Thirdly, the portfolio includes complete intralogistics solutions, both new planning and optimization of existing warehouses. The range extends from analysis, planning, project planning and implementation to after-sales service and is available for all degrees of automation. Jungheinrich AG offers both manual warehouse systems with the Warehouse Management System (WMS), radio data transmission services and radio data transmission equipment as well as fully automated warehouse systems with storage and retrieval machines. In addition, the company offers warehouse logistics services. The services include:

- After-sales service, i.e. inspection, maintenance and repair of equipment,
- Driver training,
- Leasing and sales financing of products,
- Reconditioning and sale of used equipment.

== Rental ==
The European rental fleet comprises around 38,100 rental forklifts with 600 vehicle variants with load-capacities ranging from 1 to 42 tons and lifting-heights of up to 17 meters.

== Locations ==
Jungheinrich is represented in 40 Group-owned sales and service companies worldwide. In addition, Jungheinrich is present through dealers, especially in overseas markets. The Group operates a logistics center for Eastern Europe in Bratislava and an assembly plant in Qingpu in the People's Republic of China.

Germany

- Hamburg, Corporate Headquarters
- Norderstedt, Production
- Lüneburg, Production
- Moosburg an der Isar and since 2013 in the Degernpoint district, production, planning and implementation of complete systems
- Klipphausen, Used Equipment Centre Dresden
- Kaltenkirchen, central warehouse spare parts
- Landsberg (near Halle) Production
- Munich, Production
- 17 distribution centres in Germany
