= Friedrich Strack =

German theologist, naturalist and writer

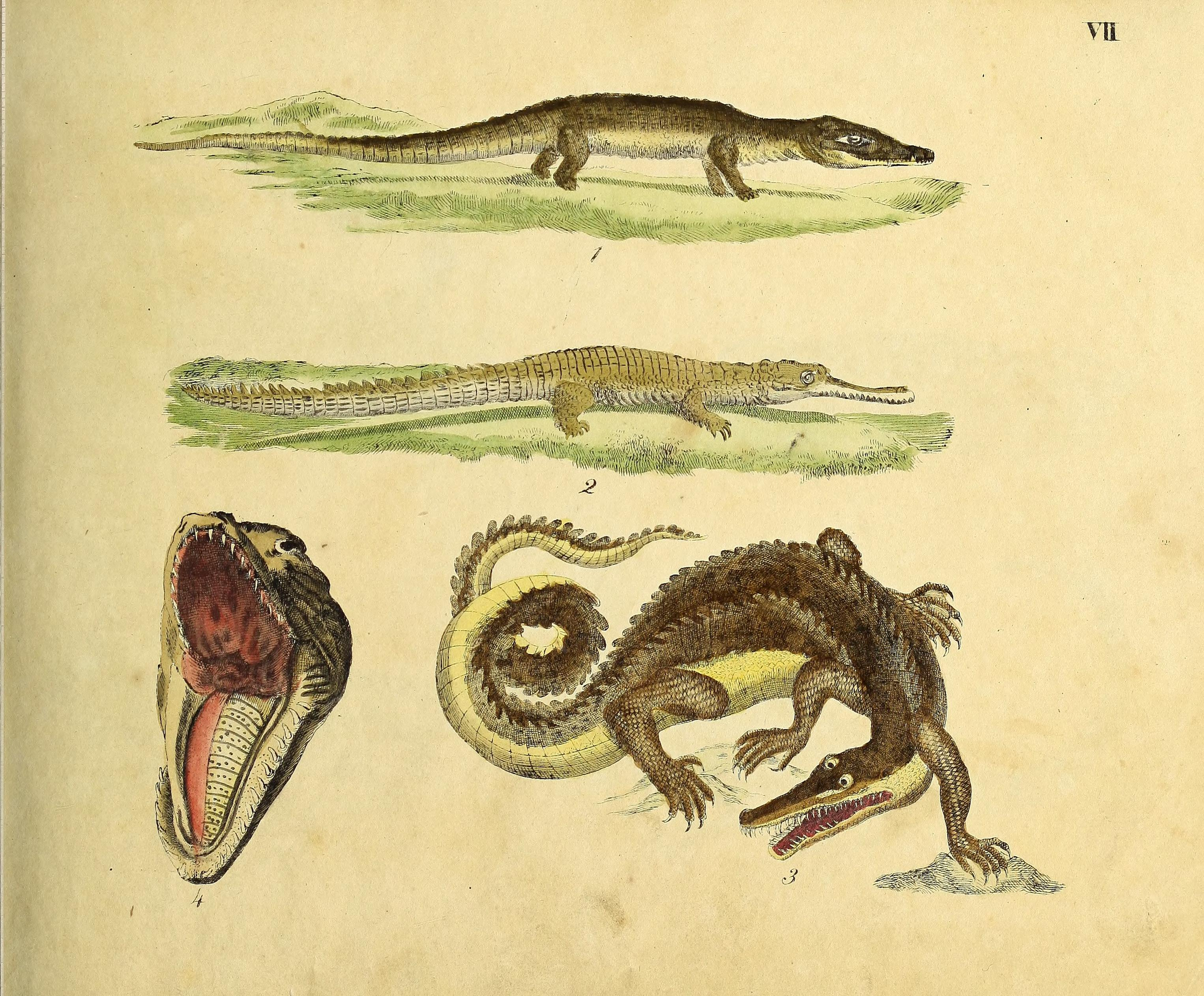
Plate of crocodilians from Naturgeschichte in Bildern mit erlauterdem (1820)

Christian Friedrich Leberecht Strack (24 January 1784, Roßleben – 25 July 1852, Bremen) was a German theologist, naturalist and writer. He wrote several collections of poems, translated classics into German including the works of Aristotle on animals which was published in several volumes as Naturgeschichte der Thiere.

Friedrich Strack was born at Roßleben monastery where his father, Friedrich Benignus Ludwig Strack was rector. He studied theology at Leipzig in 1799 and became a preacher from 1804. He taught in Halle from 1806 and at the Gymnasium at Wertheim from 1810. In 1814 he became professor of natural history at Düsseldorf and then headed a preschool in Bremen from 1817. He is best known for the illustrated (artist unknown) natural history book Naturgeschichte in Bildern mit erlauterdem (Illustrations of natural history with explanations). The four volumes, issued between 1819 and 1826, are devoted in turn to mammals, birds, reptiles and amphibians, and fishes.

== Works ==
- Evolution des Geistes. Jena um 1800
- Die Briefe des Plinius des Jüngeren. 2. Bände, Frankfurt am Main 1819
- Julius Cäsars Denkwürdigkeiten aus dem Gallischen Kriege. Otto Hendel, Halle.
- Selbst-Erfahrung oder Selbst-Entsagung? Goethes Deutung und Kritik des Pietismus in 'Wilhelm Meisters Lehrjahre'.
- Naturgeschichte in Bildern mit erläuterndem Text. Arnz & Co., Düsseldorf 1819–1826 online
