= Dieter Strack =

German basketball player

Personal information
- Born: Gießen, West Germany
- Listed height: 6 ft 4 in (1.93 m)

Career information
- Playing career: 1968–1977
- Position: Forward
- Number: 12

Career history
- 1968–1977: Gießen 46ers

Dieter Strack (born in Gießen, West Germany) is a retired German professional basketball player who had a nine-year career at LTi Gießen 46ers where plays in the Basketball Bundesliga the highest German basketball division. Overall Gießen got the Cup four times. Strack won the Cup of the Basketball Bundesliga two times. He played 161 professional games for LTi Gießen 46ers and made 740 scores, his average strike rate is tending to 4,60 scores per match. Dieter Stack is known for his dangerous left pitching-hand shoots and his high jumps. He is 1.94 meters tall and played as forward and shooting forward. Today Strack is one of the Gießener legends in the "Gutt Stubb" also known as Sporthalle Gießen-Ost, the home arena of Gießen 46ers.
