= Adolph Hansen =

German botanist (1851–1920)

Karl Adolph Hansen (1851 – 1920) was a German botanist. He was born in Hamburg and graduated in 1887 at the University of Würzburg with a thesis entitled "Geschichte der Assimilation und Chlorophyllfunktion" (supervised by Julius Sachs). He was professor of botany at the Justus Liebig-Universität Gießen 1891-1920. He had very broad academic interests, including history and archaeology. However, he always worked alone, supervised very few doctoral students (4 in 39 years), and stood outside the development of experimental physiological botany among his contemporaries. Hansen wrote scholarly works on Goethe's Metamorphosis of Plants and had an aggressive dispute over this hypothesis with Houston Stewart Chamberlain. He died in Giessen.

== The wind controversy with Eugenius Warming ==
In 1901, Hansen wrote a treatise of the dune vegetation of the East Frisian Islands, in which he proposed salt as the main plant-distributing factor. He thereby neglected previous work by Warming and Raunkiær contending the importance of the wind. Eugenius Warming strongly criticised Hansen's work and Hansen returned by criticising Warming's Lehrbuch der ökologischen Pflanzengeographie, to which Warming gave another polemic reply.

== Selected scientific works ==
- Hansen, Ad. (1882) Geschichte der Assimilation und Chlorophyllfunction. Leipzig: Wilhelm Engelmann, 90 pp.
- Hansen, Ad. (1885) Die Ernährung der Pflanzen. Leipzig und Prag, Freytag & Tempsky, 1885. 268 pp. (Das Wissen der Gegenwart, vol. 38.)
- Systematische Charakteristik der medicinisch-wichtigen Pflanzenfamilien, nebst Angabe der Abstammung der wichtigeren Arzneistoffe des Pflanzenreichs . Stahel, Würzburg 1889 Digital edition by the University and State Library Düsseldorf
- Hansen, Ad. (1907) Goethes Metamorphose der Pflanzen. Geschichte einer botanischen Hypothese. 2 Teile. Gießen: Alfred Töpelmann
- Die Pflanze : mit 33 Abb.. Göschen, Berlin 1914 Digital edition by the University and State Library Düsseldorf
- Hansen, Ad. (1919) Goethes Morphologie (Metamorphose der Planzen und Osteologie) Ein Beitrag zum sachlichen und philosophischen Verständnis und zur Kritik der morphologischen Begriffsbildung. Giessen: Alfred Töpelmann, 1919. 200 pp.
