= Jesko Friedrich =

German actor

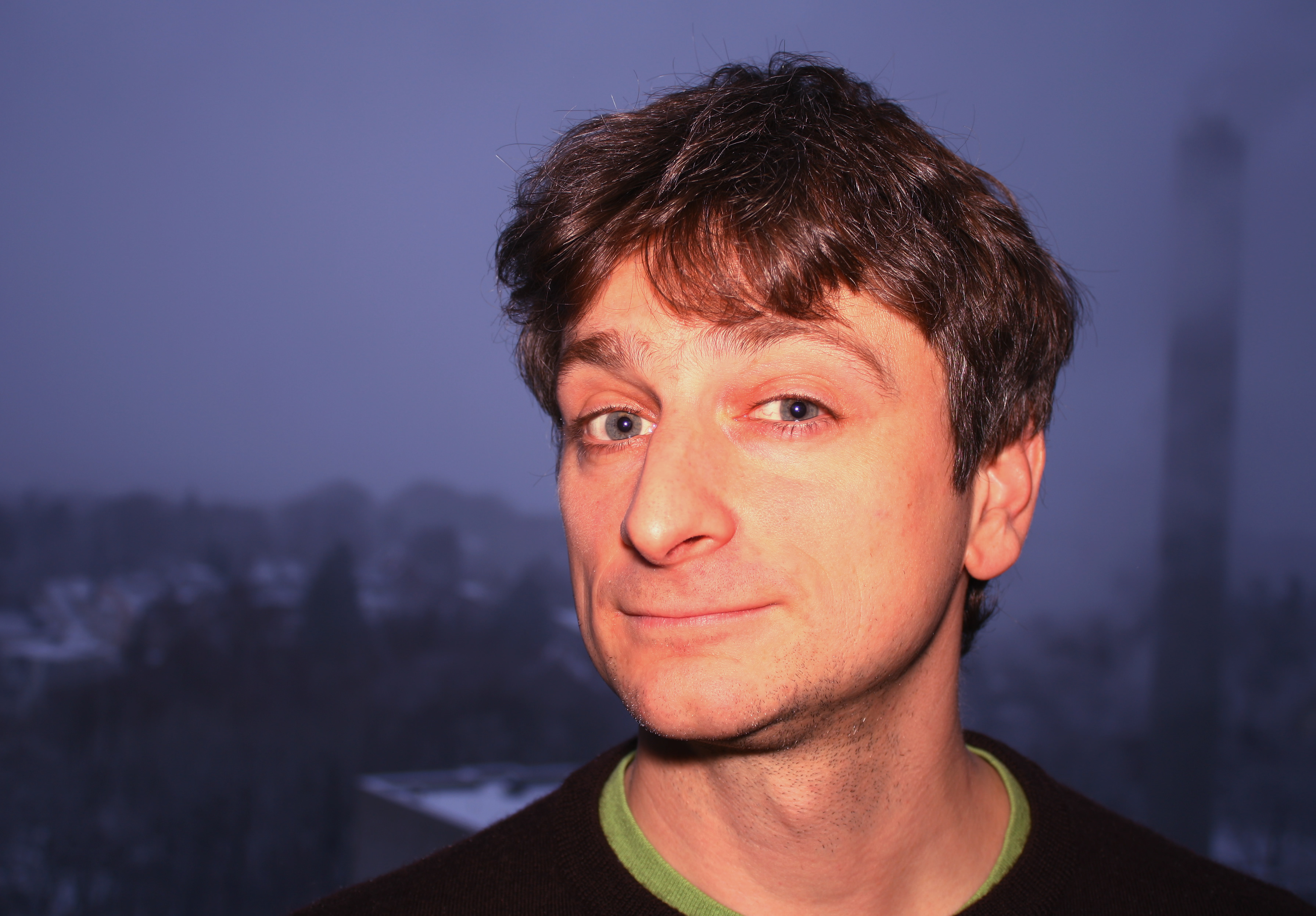
- Jesko Friedrich, January 2010
- Born: 2 April 1974 (age 52); Gießen

Jesko Friedrich (born 2 April 1974 in Gießen) is a German comedy television actor and writer.

== Early life and career ==
Friedrich grew up in Lübeck and has a doctorate in German studies at the Georg-August-Universität in Göttingen.

Friedrich started writing jokes for the show Freitag Nacht News ("Friday Night News"). Since 2001, Friedrich worked at the Norddeutscher Rundfunk, mostly as a writer, producer, and actor for the satire show Extra 3, and for other comedy shows. Beginning in 2003, together with Dennis Kaupp, he developed the recurring show segment Johannes Schlüter. Friedrich plays the role of Johannes Schlüter, a character who works absurd jobs in every episode (for example as speaker on women's rights for the Christian Social Union of Bavaria, bush pilot, or peddler of flags ready to be burned by protesters), and is interviewed by Kaupp. The segment was awarded the Adolf Grimme Award in 2009.

From 2005 to 2008 Friedrich and Kaupp produced their own comedy show Sehr witzig ("Very Funny") for the NDR. Both acted as directors, authors and actors. Since 2009 he has again worked with Kaupp on the show Dennis und Jesko, a successor to Sehr witzig. He also had a role in the short film trilogy Eine Nacht in Wilhelmsburg ("A Night in Wilhemsburg") (2005, 2006 und 2007).

== Awards ==
- Adolf Grimme Award 2009 in the "Special" category
- Nomination for a German Comedy Award in the category "Best Sketch Comedy"

== Publications ==
- Friedrich, Jesko (2006). Phraseologisches Wörterbuch des Mittelhochdeutschen : Redensarten, Sprichwörter und andere feste Wortverbindungen in Texten von 1050–1350 [Phraseological Dictionary of the Middle High German : Phrases, proverbs, and other fixed word combinations in texts from 1050–1350]. Reihe Germanistische Linguistik, 264 (in German). Tübingen: M. Niemeyer. ISBN 978-3-484-31264-7. OCLC 69105515.
