= Giessen =

Town in Hesse, Germany

Giessen Gießen
- Town
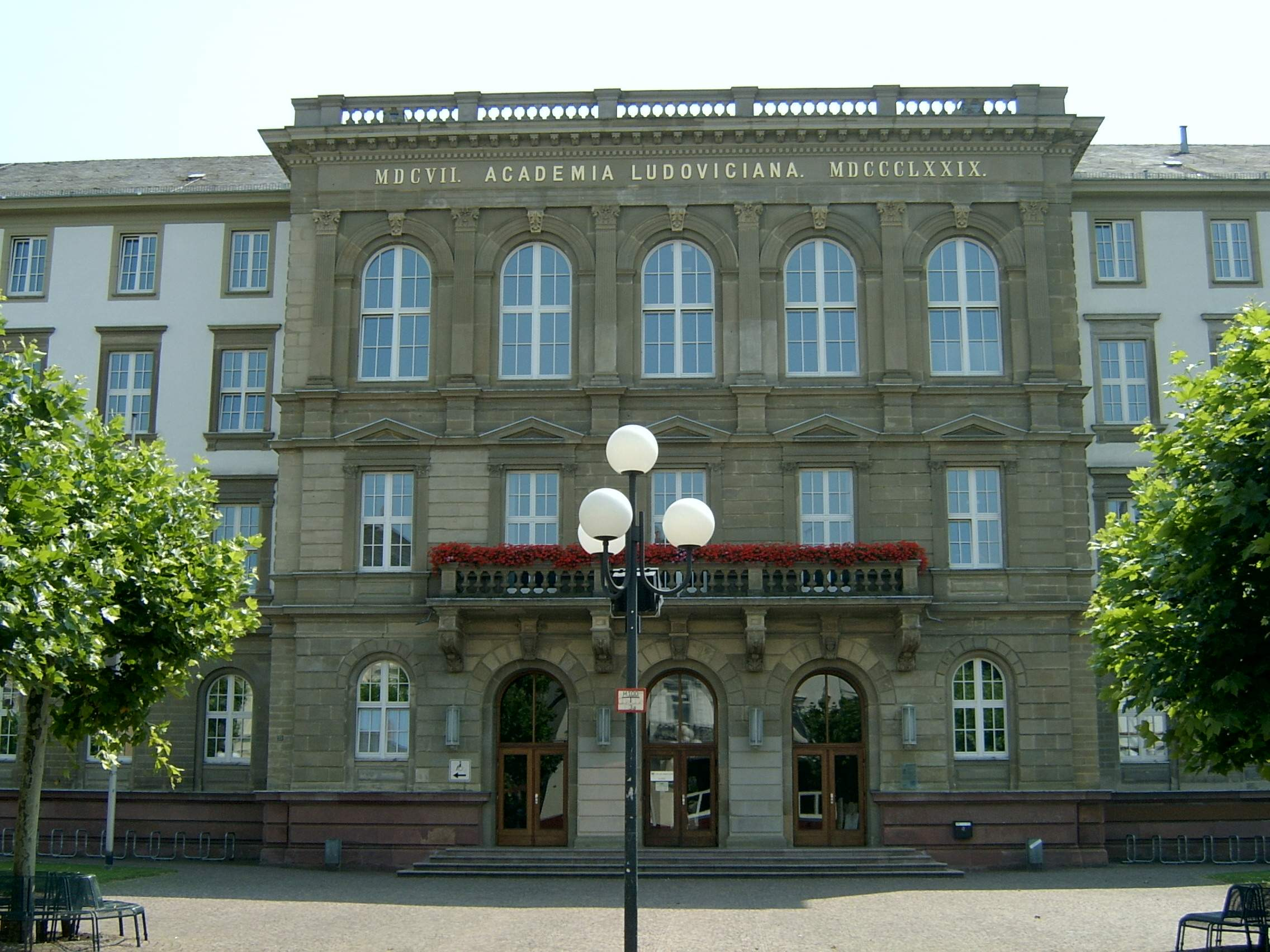
- Main building of Justus Liebig University

- Coat of arms

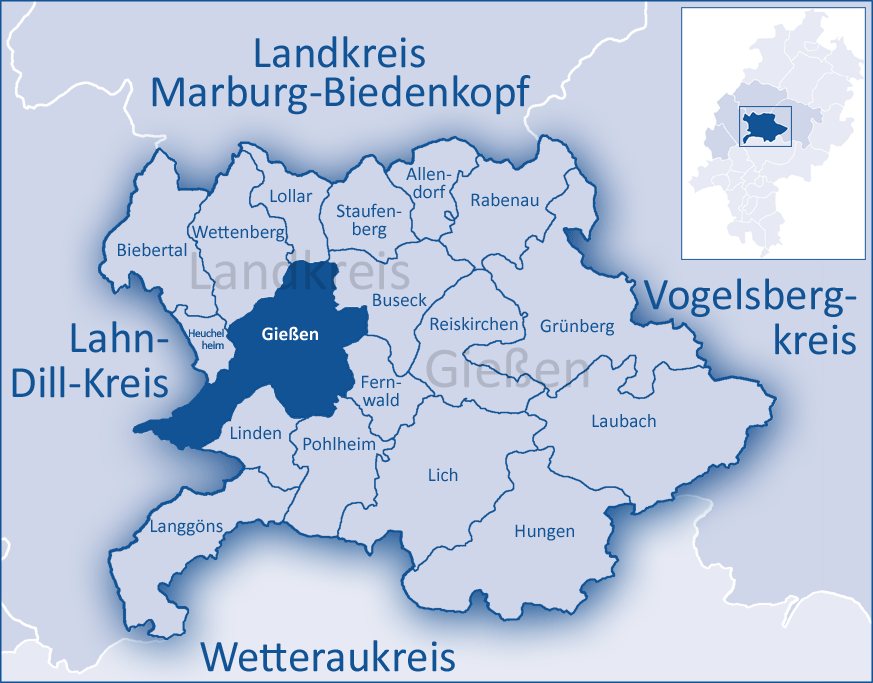
- Location of Giessen within Giessen district
- Interactive map of Giessen
- Location within Germany Location within Hesse
- Coordinates: 50°35′N 8°40′E
- Country: Germany
- State: Hesse
- Admin. region: Giessen
- District: Giessen
- Subdivisions: 6 Stadtteile

Government
  - Mayor (2021–27): Frank-Tilo Becher (SPD)

Area
  - Total: 72.55 km^{2} (28.01 sq mi)
- Elevation: 159 m (522 ft)

Population (2025-12-31)
  - Total: 88,544
  - Density: 1,220/km^{2} (3,161/sq mi)
- Time zone: UTC+01:00 (CET)
  - Summer (DST): UTC+02:00 (CEST)
- Postal codes: 35390–35398
- Dialling codes: 0641, 06403
- Vehicle registration: GI
- Website: www.giessen.de

Giessen, spelled Gießen in German (German pronunciation: [ˈɡiːsn̩]), is a town in the German state (Bundesland) of Hesse, capital of both the district of Giessen and the administrative region of Giessen. The population is approximately 90,000, with roughly 37,000 university students.

The name comes from Giezzen, as it was first referred to in 1197, which refers to the position of the town between several rivers, lakes and streams. The largest river in Giessen is the Lahn, which divides the town in two parts (west and east), roughly 50 kilometres (31 miles) north of Frankfurt am Main. Giessen is also home to the University of Giessen.

In 1969, the town hosted the ninth Hessentag state festival.

== History ==
Giessen came into being as a moated castle in 1152 built by Count Wilhelm von Gleiberg, although the history of the community in the northeast and in today's suburb called "Wieseck" dates back to 775. The town became part of Hesse-Marburg in 1567, passing to Hesse-Darmstadt in 1604. The University of Giessen was founded in 1607. Giessen was included within the Grand Duchy of Hesse created in 1806 during the Napoleonic Wars. After the First World War, it was part of the People's State of Hesse.

During the Second World War, a subcamp of the Buchenwald concentration camp was in the Heil- und Pflegeanstalt Licher Straße. Heavy bombing destroyed about 75 percent of Giessen in 1944, including most of the town's historic buildings. It became part of the modern state of Hesse after the war.

The city's civilian regional airport, having opened in 1924, was militarized following the establishment of the National Socialist Government in Germany in 1933, and became the founding place of the infamous Kampfgeschwader 55 Luftwaffe bomber unit during World War II. Closing the end of the European theatre of World War II, units of the 1st US Army reached Giessen by early April 1945. The captured airfield would be classified as "Advanced Landing Ground Y-84", briefly used for casualty evacuation and combat resupply by the X Air Service Command, Ninth Air Force. Following German capitulation on May 8, 1945, it was re-designated as "Army Air Forces Station Giessen" until June 1945, whereas the Ninth Air Force vacated the premises to allow the 56th Quartermaster Battalion of the United States Army Quartermaster Corps to converted it to the Giessen Army Depot. The Giessen Army Depot had a population of up to 10,000 American soldiers and their families. Gießen was also the site of the central US army depot for all of Europe as well as the site of a special ammunition depot. The base is a converted German Army Air Field which is reflected in some of the buildings including the housing area. A theatre, known as the Keller Theatre, is a converted German Army Officers' Club. As of 28 September 2007, the Giessen Depot and all other U.S. facilities in the greater Giessen area were returned to local German authorities. The former U.S. Army housing buildings were converted for civilian use.

In 1977, Giessen was merged with the neighbouring city Wetzlar to form the new city of Lahn. However, this attempt to reorganize the administration was reversed in 1979, due to unpopularity by both cities' population. It was then part of the Darmstadt region (Regierungsbezirk) between 1945 and 1981, until the Giessen (region) was founded on 1 January 1981.

After the war, the city was twinned with Winchester, UK.

Largest groups of foreign residents
Nationality	Population (2011)
Turkey	1,922
Greece	569
Italy	425

== International relations ==
Giessen is twinned with:

Hradec Králové, Czech Republic (since 1990); Gödöllő, Hungary (since 1988); Netanya, Israel (since 1978); Ferrara, Italy (since 1998)	San Juan del Sur, Nicaragua (since 1986); Winchester, United Kingdom (since 1962); Waterloo, Iowa, United States (since 1981); Wenzhou, Zhejiang, China (since 2011)

== Points of interest ==
- Akademischer Forstgarten Gießen, botanical gardens
- Botanischer Garten Gießen, established in 1609, is the oldest botanical garden in Germany still at its original location.
- Old Cemetery, (German: Alter Friedhof), is the resting place of Wilhelm Conrad Röntgen, his wife Anna Bertha Röntgen, and Hugo von Ritgen.
- Liebig-Museum was established in 1920 to honor the chemist Justus von Liebig.
- Mathematikum was established in 2002, offering a wide variety of mathematical hands-on exhibits.
- University of Giessen
- Rubber Island is a residential area near the Lahn River.

== Sport ==
Giessen is home to the basketball club Giessen 46ers, five-time champion of the Basketball Bundesliga. Its home games take place at the Sporthalle Gießen-Ost. Also, Giessen has an American football team called Giessen Golden Dragons.

The handball club TV Lützellinden has won the women's Bundesliga several times, but was disbanded in 2006.

== Religion ==
The Catholic Scouts of Europe were founded in Giessen in 1975.

== Gallery ==
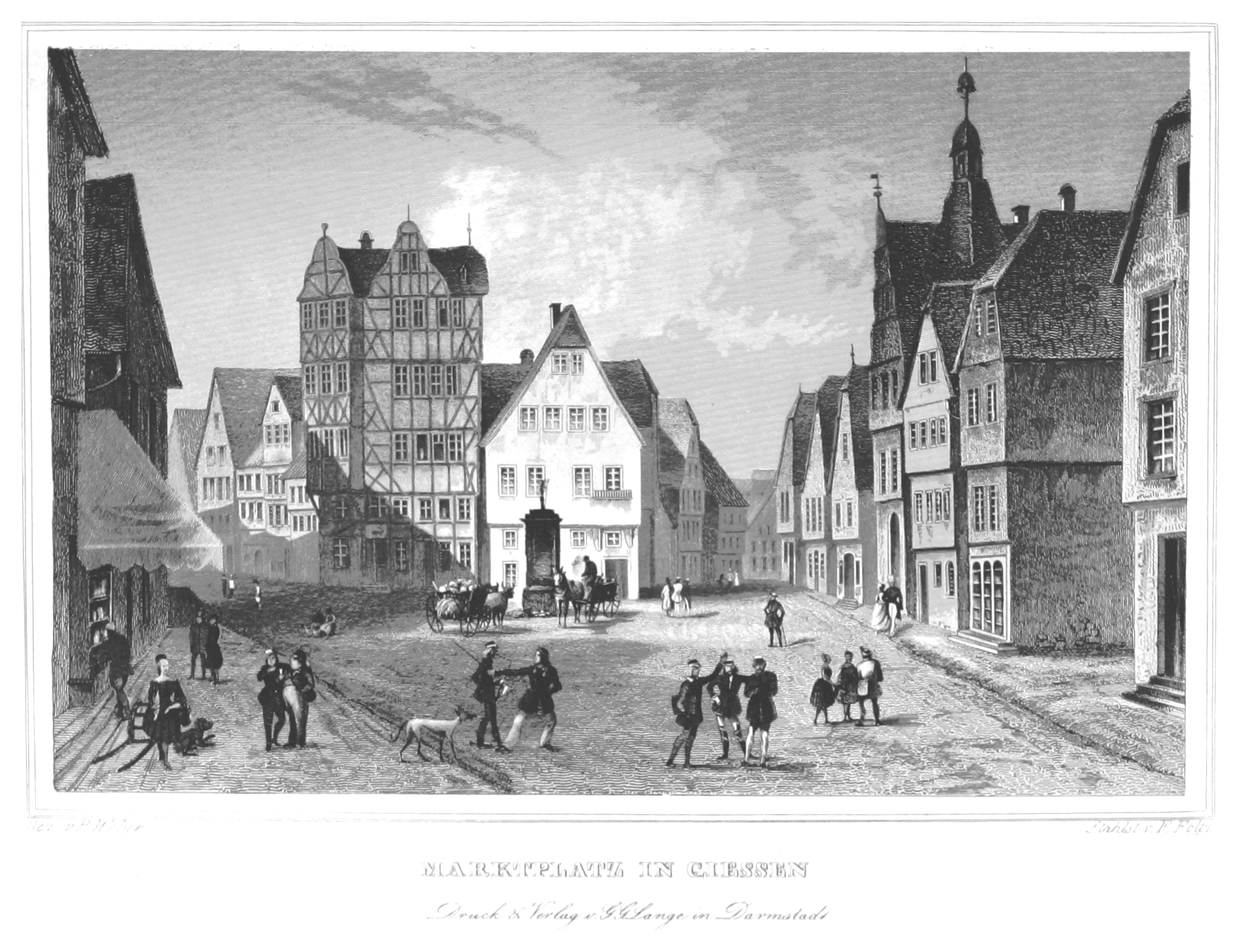
Historical drawing of the marketplace, 1844

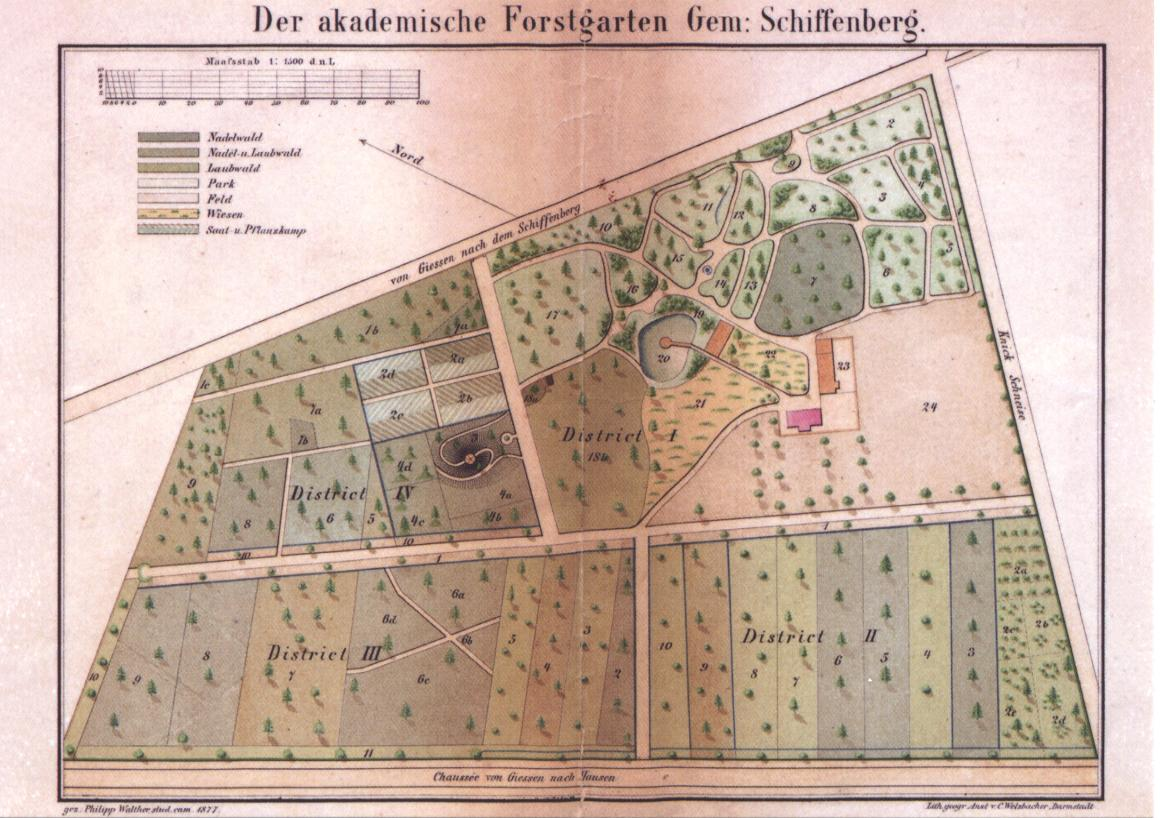
Historical drawing of the Akademischer Forstgarten Gießen, 1877

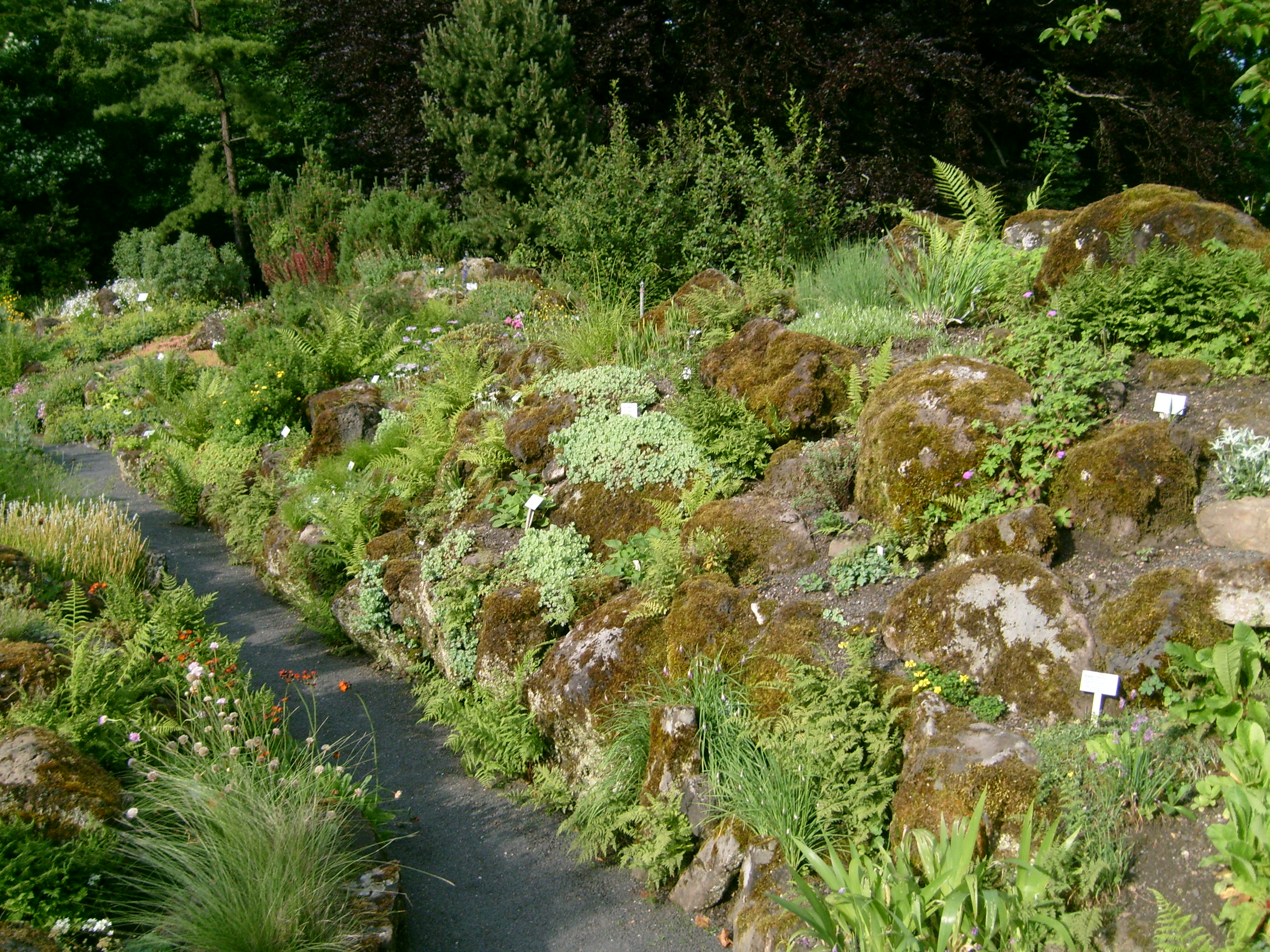
Botanical garden Gießen

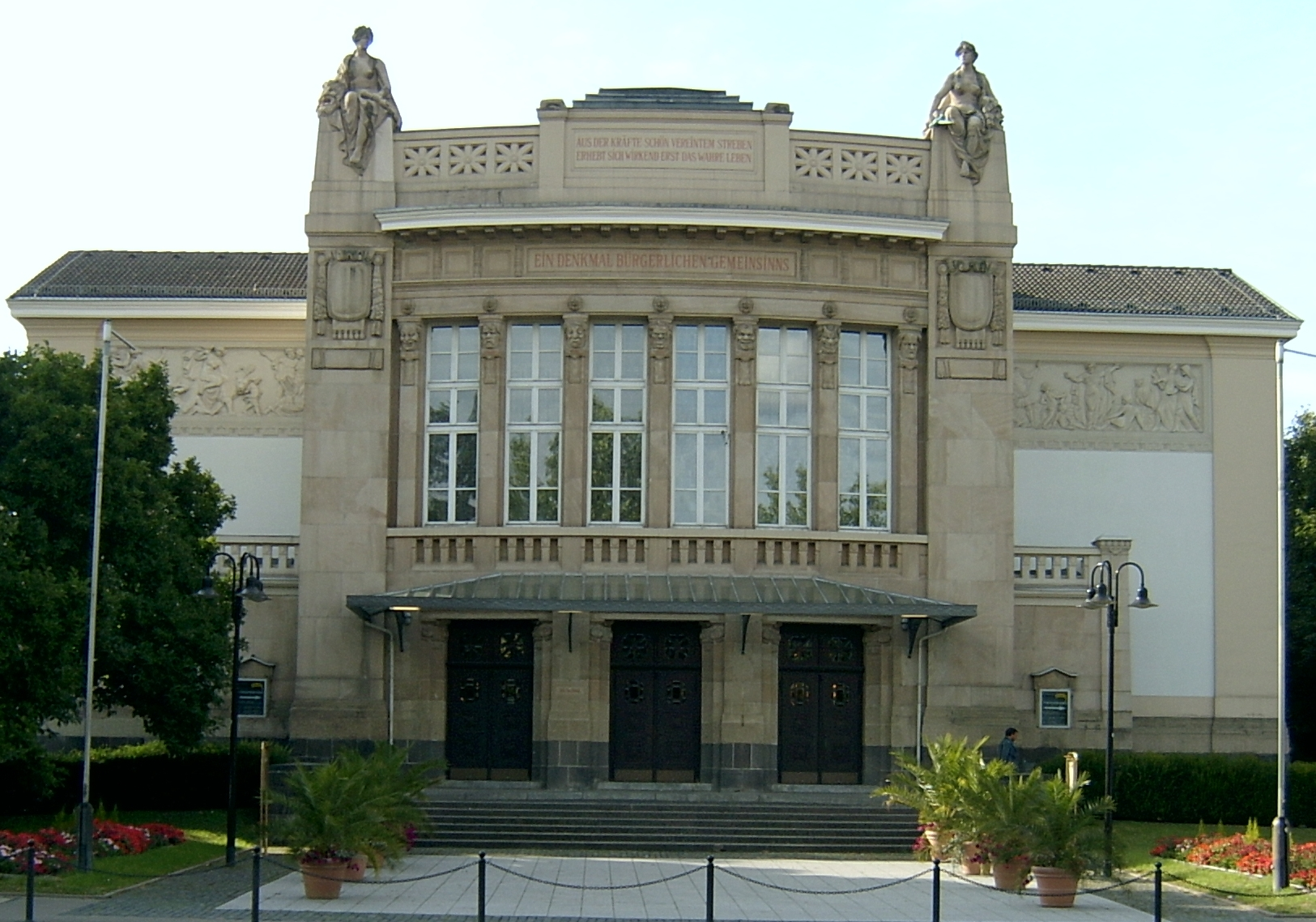
Theater Gießen

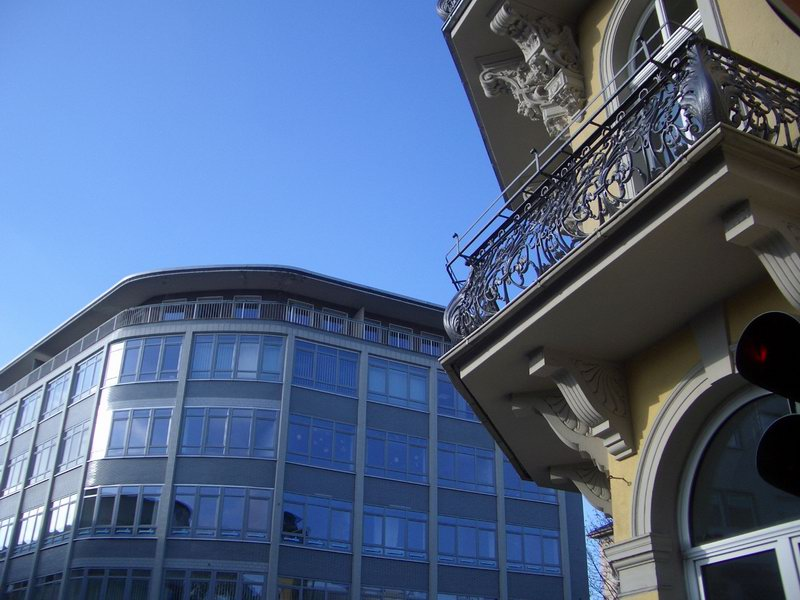
Architecture in Gießen

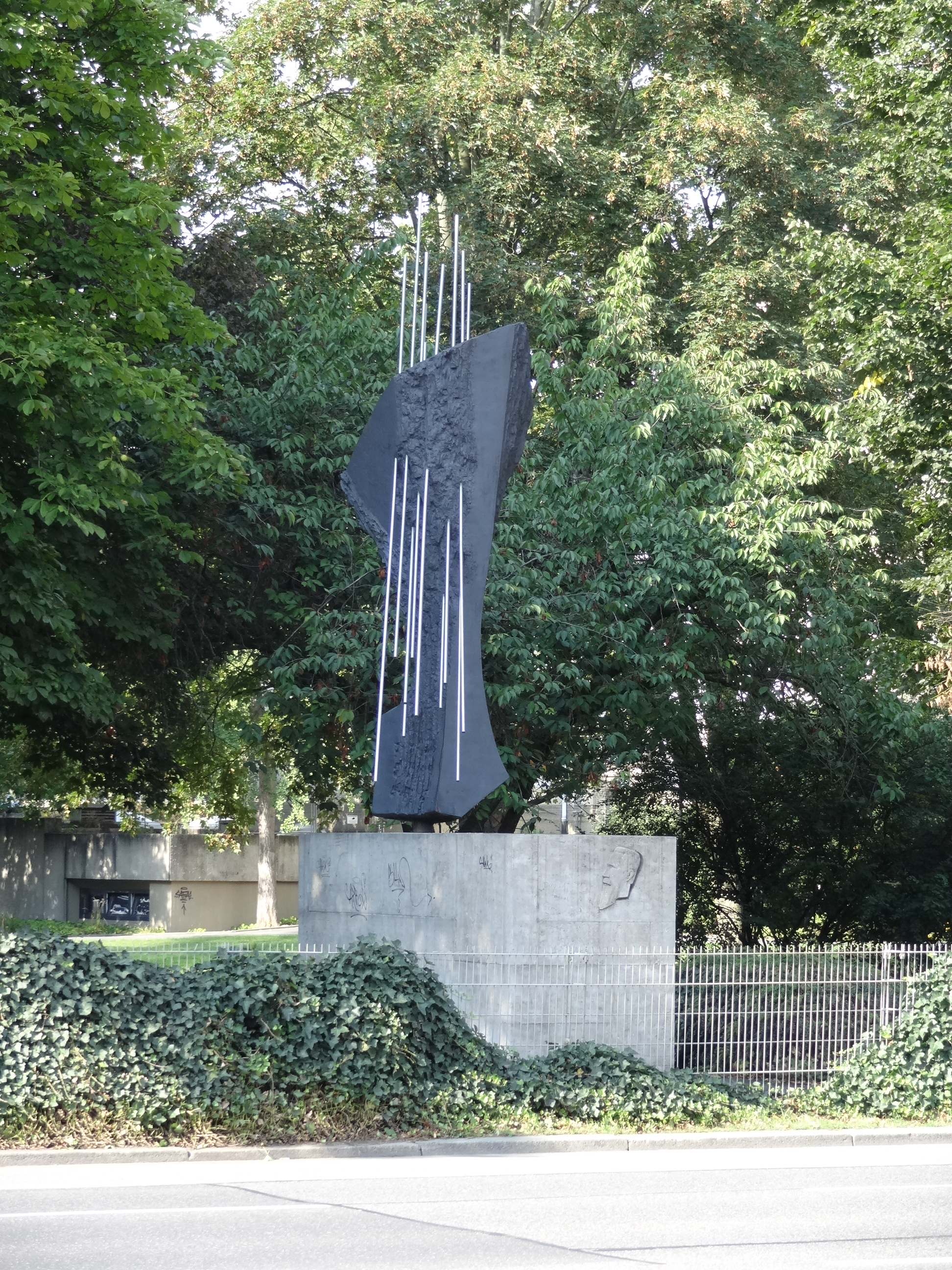
Röntgen memorial

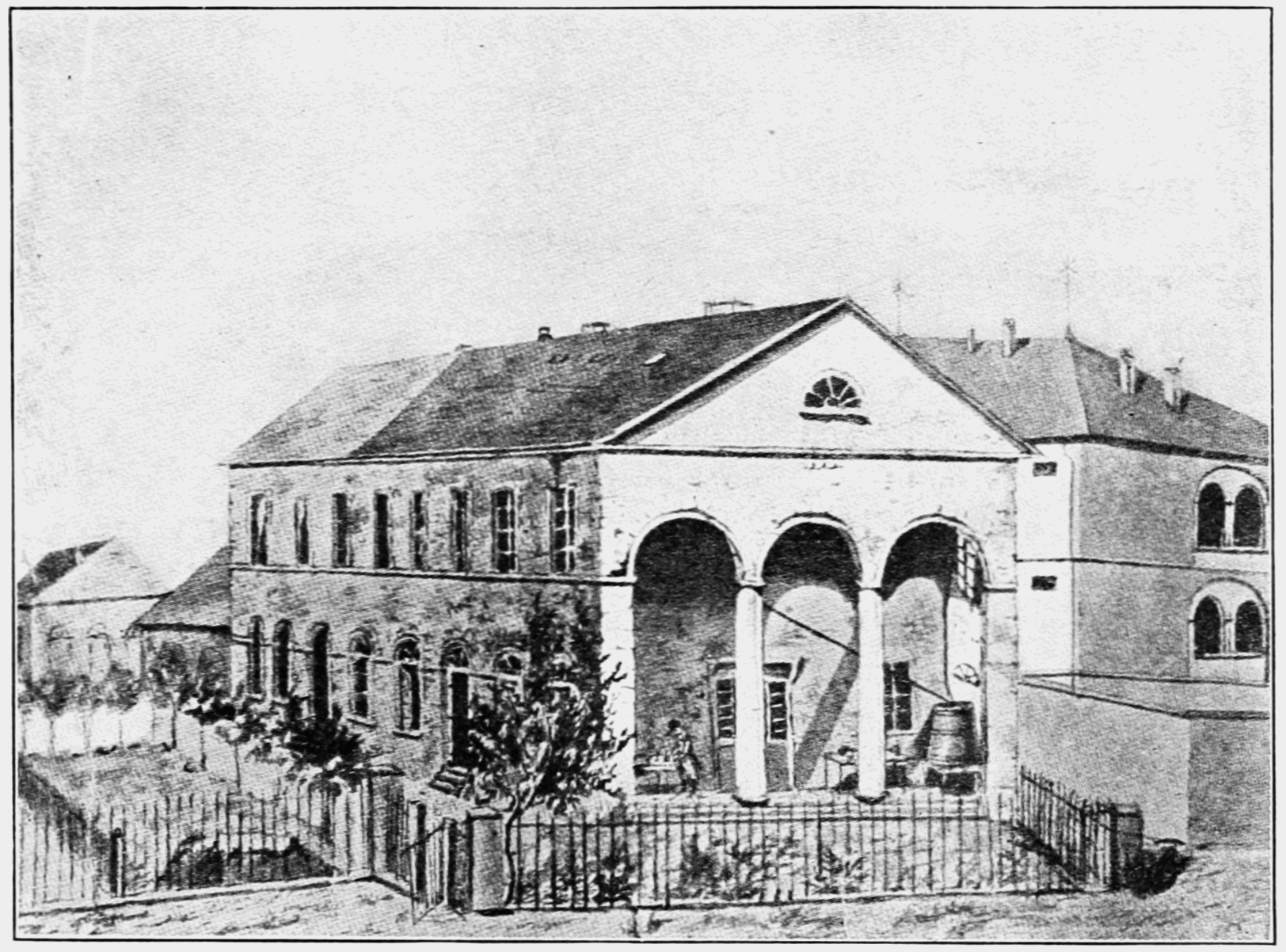
Liebig laboratory, 1909

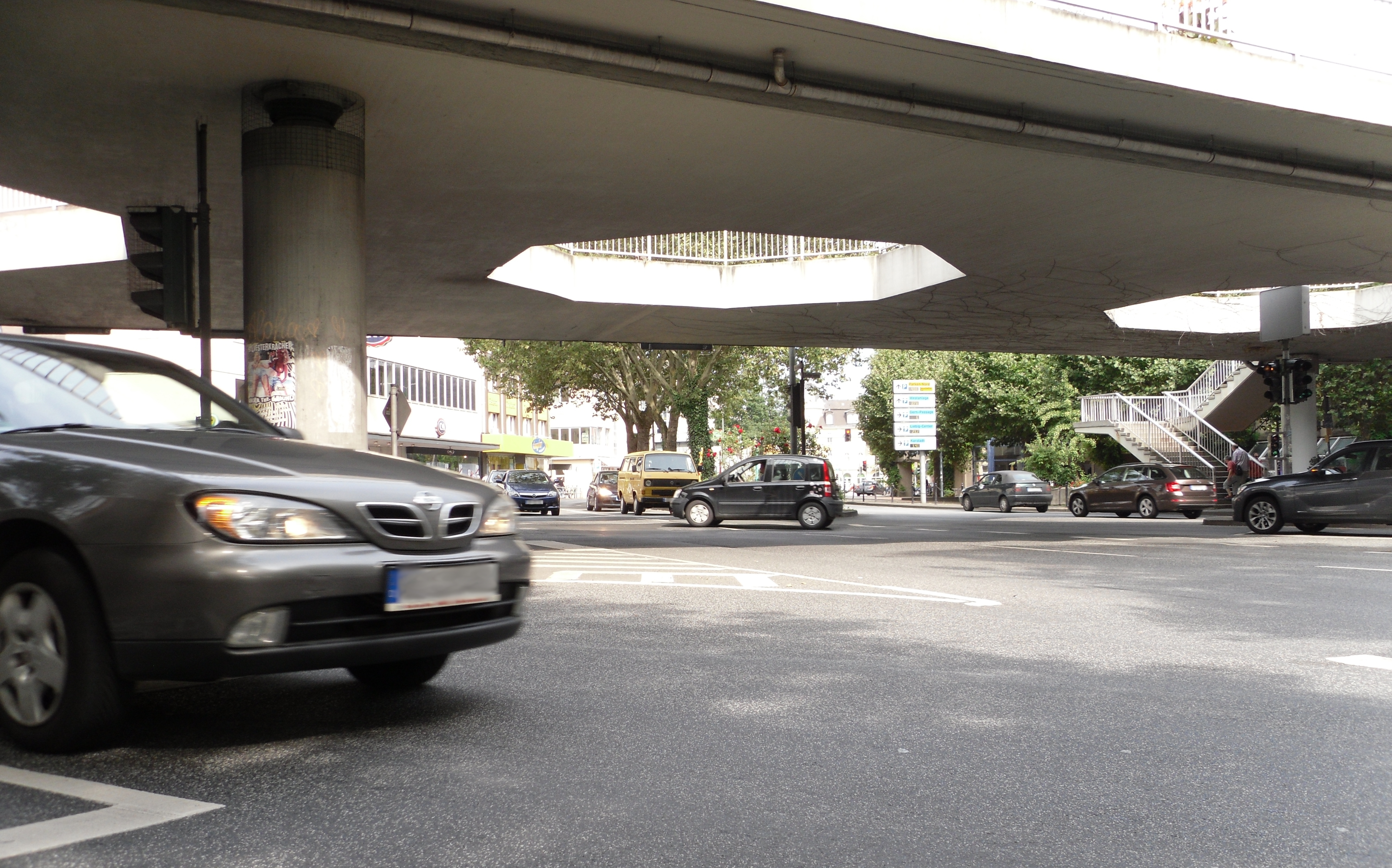
Multiway pedestrian bridge "Elefantenklo" ("Elephant loo")

== Notable people ==
- Samuel Adler (1809–1891), noted rabbi in the United States, attended the University of Giessen
- Werner A. Baum (1923–1999), meteorologist and college administrator
- Annika Beck (born 1994), professional tennis player
- Stefan Bellof (1957–1985), Formula One and World Sportscar Championship driver, who was killed during a race held in Spa-Francorchamps
- Christa Blanke (born 1948), theologist, founder of Animals' Angels e.V.
- Volker Bouffier (born 1951), politician (CDU)
- Helge Braun (born 1972), politician (CDU)
- Georg Büchner (1813–1837) studied two years at the University of Gießen
- Daniel Davari (born 1988), Iranian footballer.
- Ernst Dieffenbach, born Johann Karl Ernst Dieffenbach (1811–1855), German physician, geologist and naturalist
- Georg Christian Dieffenbach (1822–1901), German poet and theologian
- Johann Friedrich Dieffenbach (1792–1847), German surgeon
- Eduard Dingeldey (1886-1942), lawyer and politician
- Walter Dornberger (1895–1980), rocket scientist
- Paul Karl Ludwig Drude (1863–1906) physicist specializing in optics
- Peter Düttmann (1923–2001), Luftwaffe Ace
- Landgravine Elisabeth Amalie of Hesse-Darmstadt (1635–1709), Electress Palatine
- Charles Friedek (born 1971), triple jumper, gold medallist at the 1999 World Championships in Athletics
- Jesko Friedrich (born 1974), comedy television actor and writer
- Adolph Hansen (1851–1920), botanist and professor at University of Giessen
- Paul Gordan (1837–1912), mathematician, known for work in invariant theory
- Fritz Pfeffer (1889–1944), dentist, hid in the Anne Frank House during WWII
- Fritz Heichelheim (1901–1968), economic historian
- August Wilhelm von Hofmann (1818–1892), chemist
- Juli, rock band
- Friedrich Kellner (1885–1970), Chief Regional Auditor in Giessen 1948–1950, and Chief Justice Inspector of Laubach, where he wrote his secret WWII diary. The Holocaust Research Unit of Justus Liebig University of Giessen has established the Kellner Project
- Karl Kling (1910–2003), racing driver and head of Mercedes-Benz Motorsport
- Jonathan Koch (born 1985), rower
- Harald Lesch (born 1960), physicist, astronomer, natural philosopher, author, television presenter, professor of physics
- Chris Liebing (born 1968) techno/electronic music producer and DJ
- Justus von Liebig (1803–1873), chemist, professor. The official name of the University of Giessen is now Justus Liebig University
- Wilhelm Liebknecht (1826–1900), founder of the Social Democratic Party of Germany
- Sigmund Livingston (1872–1946), American lawyer, founder and first president of the Anti-Defamation League
- Christopher Ludwick (1720–1801) Baker General for the American Revolutionary War Army – Philadelphia
- Alfred Milner (1854–1925), British statesman
- Demis Nikolaidis (born 1973), Greek footballer
- James J. O'Donnell (born 1950), American scholar and university administrator, born in Giessen
- Albert Osswald (1919–1996), politician
- Lucia Puttrich (born 1961), politician
- Wilhelm Conrad Röntgen (1845–1923), physicist, professor of physics from 1879 until 1888 at the University of Giessen. He was buried at the "Alte Friedhof", where his tomb can still be found
- Johann Georg Rosenmüller (1736–1815), professor of theology at the university
- Jochen Schropp (born 1978), German actor and television entertainer
- Til Schweiger (born 1968), actor, director and producer. Grew up, went to school and started studying in Giessen
- Wilhelm Sievers (1860–1921), geographer, explorer, professor at the university
- Henrietta Skelton (1839/1842–1900), social reformer, writer, organizer, lecturer
- Dieter Strack, retired German professional basketball player
- Julian Theobald (born 1984), racing driver
- Tabea Waßmuth (born 1996), footballer
- Julius Wilbrand (1839–1906), German chemist, discoverer of TNT
- Marie Wittich (1868–1931), opera singer
- Willy Zschietzschmann (1900–1976), Classical archeologist and author

== Education ==
- MBML: The International Graduate Programme "Molecular Biology and Medicine of the Lung" of the University of Giessen Lung Center
- University hospital Giessen und Marburg
- Mittelhessen University of Applied Sciences
- University of Giessen

== Manisch ==
Manisch is a dialect of rotwelsch spoken in and around Giessen by people in lower income neighbourhoods, some of which are known as "Eulenkopf", "Gummiinsel", "Heyerweg" and "Margaretenhütte". Approximately 700–750 residents spoke the dialect fluently as of 1976. Although the dialect still influences the Giessen vernacular, it is nearly extinct in terms of fluent speakers.

== Geography ==
=== Climate ===
Climate in this area has mild differences between highs and lows, and there is adequate rainfall year-round. The Köppen Climate Classification subtype for this climate is "Cfb". (Marine West Coast Climate).

Climate data for Giessen (1991–2020 normals)
Month	Jan	Feb	Mar	Apr	May	Jun	Jul	Aug	Sep	Oct	Nov	Dec	Year
Mean daily maximum °C (°F)	4.0 (39.2)	5.6 (42.1)	10.2 (50.4)	15.4 (59.7)	19.3 (66.7)	22.7 (72.9)	25.0 (77.0)	24.7 (76.5)	19.8 (67.6)	13.9 (57.0)	8.0 (46.4)	4.5 (40.1)	14.4 (57.9)
Daily mean °C (°F)	1.4 (34.5)	2.2 (36.0)	5.6 (42.1)	9.8 (49.6)	13.8 (56.8)	17.1 (62.8)	19.0 (66.2)	18.6 (65.5)	14.3 (57.7)	9.6 (49.3)	5.3 (41.5)	2.2 (36.0)	9.9 (49.8)
Mean daily minimum °C (°F)	−1.2 (29.8)	−1.1 (30.0)	1.2 (34.2)	4.2 (39.6)	8.0 (46.4)	11.2 (52.2)	13.2 (55.8)	12.8 (55.0)	9.3 (48.7)	5.8 (42.4)	2.5 (36.5)	−0.2 (31.6)	5.5 (41.9)
Average precipitation mm (inches)	48.6 (1.91)	35.9 (1.41)	42.2 (1.66)	37.9 (1.49)	57.9 (2.28)	59.8 (2.35)	73.5 (2.89)	61.7 (2.43)	49.8 (1.96)	49.9 (1.96)	48.9 (1.93)	55.8 (2.20)	626.9 (24.68)
Average precipitation days (≥ 1.0 mm)	16.3	14.6	14.6	12.5	13.8	13.6	15.0	13.3	12.5	15.5	16.4	17.7	176.9
Average snowy days (≥ 1.0 cm)	6.1	4.8	1.2	0.1	0	0	0	0	0	0	0.5	3.6	16.3
Average relative humidity (%)	86.4	82.5	76.0	68.9	70.3	70.2	69.4	71.1	78.6	85.6	89.0	89.3	78.1
Mean monthly sunshine hours	47.4	75.1	129.5	185.9	207.5	221.3	226.7	216.4	152.7	95.9	43.4	34.2	1,636.1
Source: World Meteorological Organization

== See also ==
- Giessen station
- Giessen 46ers — Basketball club
- Giessen emigration society — founded 1833
