= Karl-Friedrich Stracke =

- Born: June 22, 1956 (age 69); Lichtenfels-Goddelsheim, Germany
- Occupation: Business
- Known for: CEO of Adam Opel AG; GM Europe President

Karl-Friedrich Stracke (born June 22, 1956 in Lichtenfels, Hesse) is a German engineer and was Chairman of the Management Board & Chief Executive Officer of Adam Opel AG.

== Biography ==
Karl-Friedrich Stracke was President, GM Europe and CEO of Adam Opel AG. Stracke, who was born on June 22, 1956, in the German town of Lichtenfels-Goddelsheim, draws on 30 years of experience with Opel and GM. He began his career as a mechanical engineer in the area of body-in-white construction in 1979. Following additional studies in economics at the GM University in Flint, United States, he advanced to a management position in chassis construction in 1984. In 1991 he became head of the department.

After being appointed Chief Engineer of production technology for stamping and sub-assemblies in 1993, he took on a series of cross-departmental responsibilities, including the position of Manufacturing Director at the Opel plant in Bochum, Germany, from 1995 onward. Two model launches – Astra and Zafira – as well as the plant’s implementation of lean production methods took place during this period.

In 2004, Stracke took on the position of executive director GME Engineering, responsible for Opel product development and Saab product design in Trollhättan, Sweden. In 2006, he assumed responsibility for global product design for body/interior and safety for all GM brands. Beginning in 2008, he headed the functions of global vehicle integration and proving grounds for all GM brands as Executive Director Vehicle Integration. From 2009 on, Karl-Friedrich Stracke served as Vice President, Global Vehicle Engineering, responsible for global car product development of GM. Under his leadership, engineers and technicians all over the world have developed automobiles and technologies, including the extended-range electrical cars Opel Ampera and Chevrolet Volt.

== See also ==
- General Motors
- Opel
