= Innerexile =

Phone accessory manufacturing company

Taer Innovation
- Industry: Consumer Electronics Accessories
- Founded: 2013
- Founders: David Hu
- Headquarters: Taiwan, U.S.
- Area served: International
- Products: Screen protectors, Mobile phone accessories
- Number of employees: 15 (2019)

Taer Innovation is a company that manufactures accessories that protect mobile devices from cracks and scratches.

Before the designed mobile accessories are sold to the public, the company offers a mock up to establish the suitability of the product to potential customers.

== History ==
Before 2013, self-healing protective cases were made using the in-mold decoration, IMD process. The application of this technology was costly since it necessitated the use of a membrane that was attached to a film. The film was placed on the phone's screen to protect the screen. Therefore, buying protective cases was expensive at that time.

In 2013, a new technology was discovered that provided panel coating for both screen and back panel protection. This technology enabled protective cases to withstand a scratching force of up to 750 grams, with the cases self-healing in just three minutes. In 2014, spray coating technology was discovered and further developed to create a transparent coat that prevented scratches. This breakthrough led to the invention of the instant self-repair case.

== Honors and awards ==
Taer Innovation has won design awards, leading to a market footprint in more than thirty countries worldwide. Awards include the Good Design award from 2012 to 2014, Golden Pin Design award, Taiwan Excellence award in 2014 and Computex d&I award in 2014 for their products.
