= Nunc =

Nunc A/S
- Company type: Aktieselskab
- Industry: Manufacturing
- Founded: Roskilde, Denmark (1953)
- Fate: Merged
- Successor: Nalge Nunc International
- Headquarters: Roskilde, Denmark
- Products: Plastics

Nunc A/S of Denmark was founded in 1953. Nunc specialized in laboratory plastic ware including products for cell culture, cell biology assays, sample prep, and sample storage. The company merged with the Nalge Company, which was founded in 1949 by chemist Emanuel Goldberg of Rochester, New York, in 1995.
