= Polestar Precept =

Swedish electric concept car

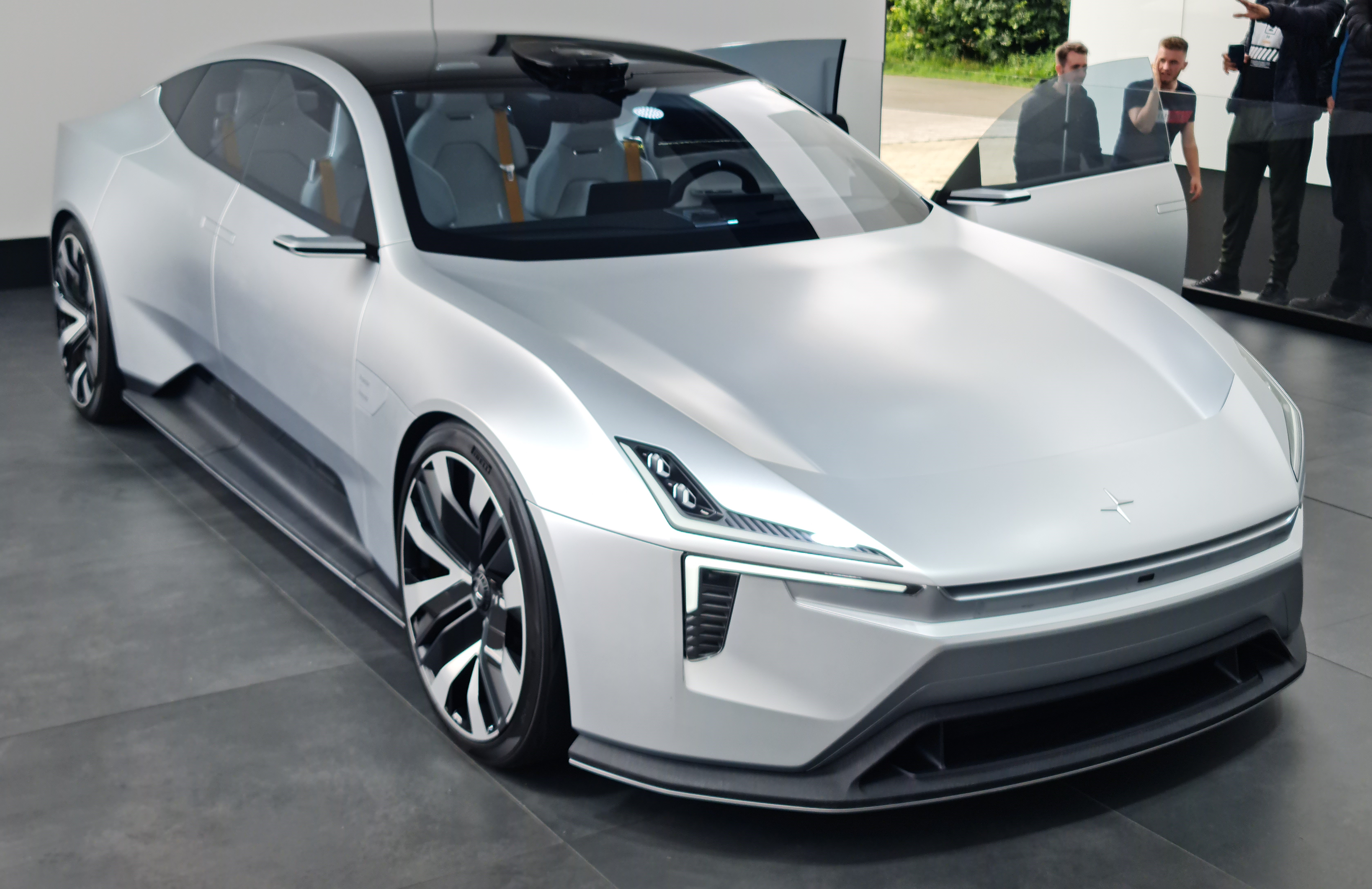
Polestar Precept

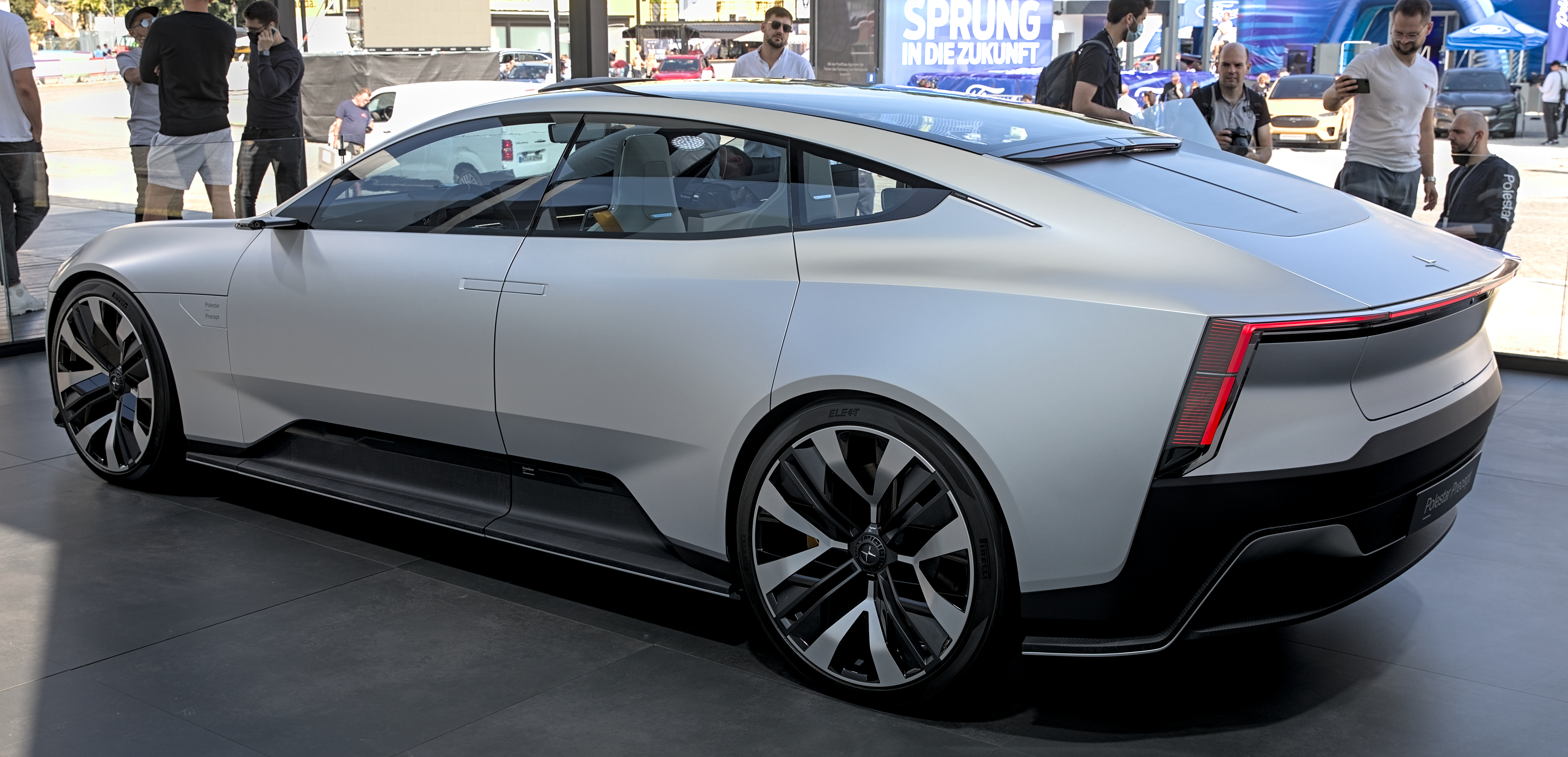
Rear view

The Polestar Precept is a 4-door electric concept car by Polestar, a subsidiary of Volvo Cars and Geely. The Precept was unveiled on February 25, 2020. Prior to precautionary cancellation due to the COVID-19 pandemic, the Precept was scheduled to debut at the 2020 Geneva Motor Show. Polestar later announced that the Precept would enter production in 2024 as the Polestar 5.

== Design ==
The Precept has a wheelbase of 122 inches and features a design that does not require B-pillars. Its design focuses on sustainability, with the interior materials utilizing flax, recycled plastic bottles, and recycled cork vinyl; minimalism is a focus of the design.

Lidar is incorporated into the roof, and there is an additional sensor array called the "SmartZone" of dual radar and a high-definition video camera built into the front of the car where a grille would traditionally be placed. The vehicle has no side nor rear-view mirrors, as these have all been replaced with cameras. The Precept runs Google's Android Automotive operating system.
