= Joyroom =

Chinese consumer electronics brand

- Native name: 机乐堂
- Type: Private
- Industry: Consumer electronics
- Founded: 2009
- Founder: Leon Sun
- Headquarters: Shenzhen
- Products: Mobile accessories
- Owner: JOYROOM Technology
- Website: www.joyroom.com

Joyroom (Chinese: 机乐堂; stylized in all caps; abbreviated as JR) is a Chinese consumer electronics brand founded by Leon Sun in 2009. Owned by Shenzhen Joyroom Technology Co., Ltd., its main products include power banks, smart wearables, as well as mounts. The representative products of the brand are the T03 Pro, and the ZS426. In September 2025, it launched the Joyroom Podix GaN charger.

Headquartered in Shenzhen, the products of Joyroom are also available in overseas markets, such as the Philippines, Bangladesh, and Spain. The brand also provides chargers for Apple Watches, as well as accessories for Quest 2 VR headsets. In 2018, it attended the World Bazaar Festival. As of the same year, its annual sales reached a few hundred million dollars.

== History ==
Joyroom was formed in 2009. In 2016, it forayed into the Bangladeshi market. In 2018, it introduced the T02. In 2019, it began operations in Nepal. In January 2020, the black edition of the T04S became available.

In October 2022, Joyroom released a phone mount named ZS243. In September 2025, the brand entered into a collaboration with TVCMall.
