= Squeeze bottle =

Type of container

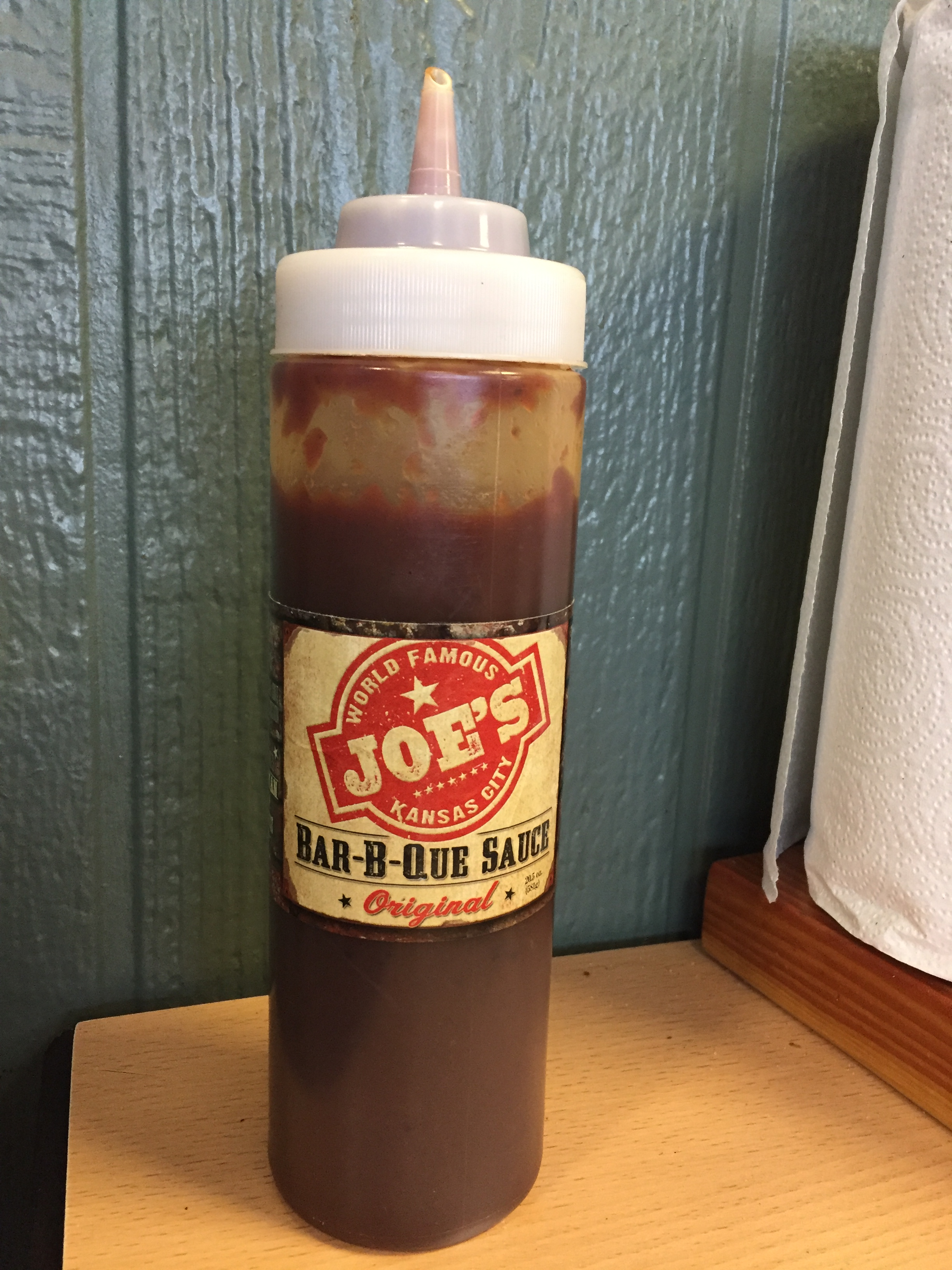
Barbecue sauce in a squeeze bottle

A squeeze bottle is a type of container such as a plastic bottle for dispensing a fluid, that is powered by squeezing the container by exerting pressure with the user's hand. Its fundamental characteristic is that manual pressure applied to a resilient hollow body is harnessed to compress fluid within it and thereby expel the fluid through some form of nozzle.

Typically, as with wash bottles and commercial resealable containers for many viscous fluids including sauces and adhesives, it is the main body of the container that is squeezed. While atomizers fit the basic pattern of squeeze bottles, they differ from those typical examples in that the squeezed component compresses and propels air, whose interaction with a volatile liquid inside a rigid container then entrains and dispenses a mist of the liquid.

The relevant United States Patent Classification is: B65D1/32 Containers adapted to be temporarily deformed by external pressure to expel contents.

== See also ==
- Soap dispenser
- Wash bottle
- Spray bottle

== Sources ==
- Yam, K. L., "Encyclopedia of Packaging Technology", John Wiley & Sons, 2009, ISBN 978-0-470-08704-6
