= Nalgene =

Brand of plastic products

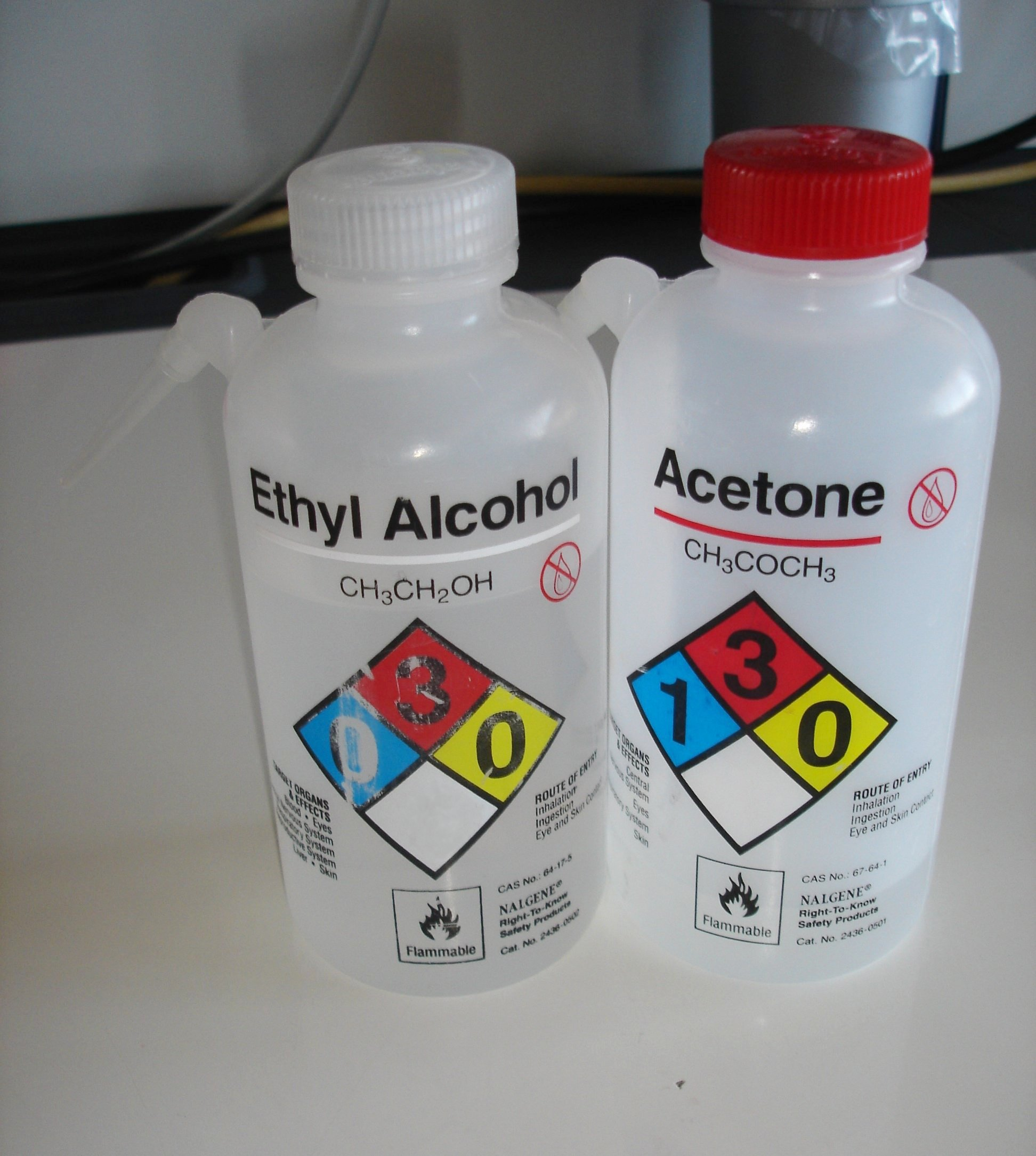
Two Nalgene wash bottles featuring the NFPA 704 color code for hazardous materials identification

Nalgene is a brand of plastic products developed originally for laboratory use, including items such as jars, bottles, test tubes, and Petri dishes, that were shatterproof and lighter than glass. The properties of plastic products make them suitable for work with many substances in various temperature ranges.

Nalgene products are manufactured by Nalge Nunc International, which in 2004 became a subsidiary of Fisher Scientific, now Thermo Fisher Scientific. The name Nalgene is a registered trademark.

== Nalgene Outdoor ==
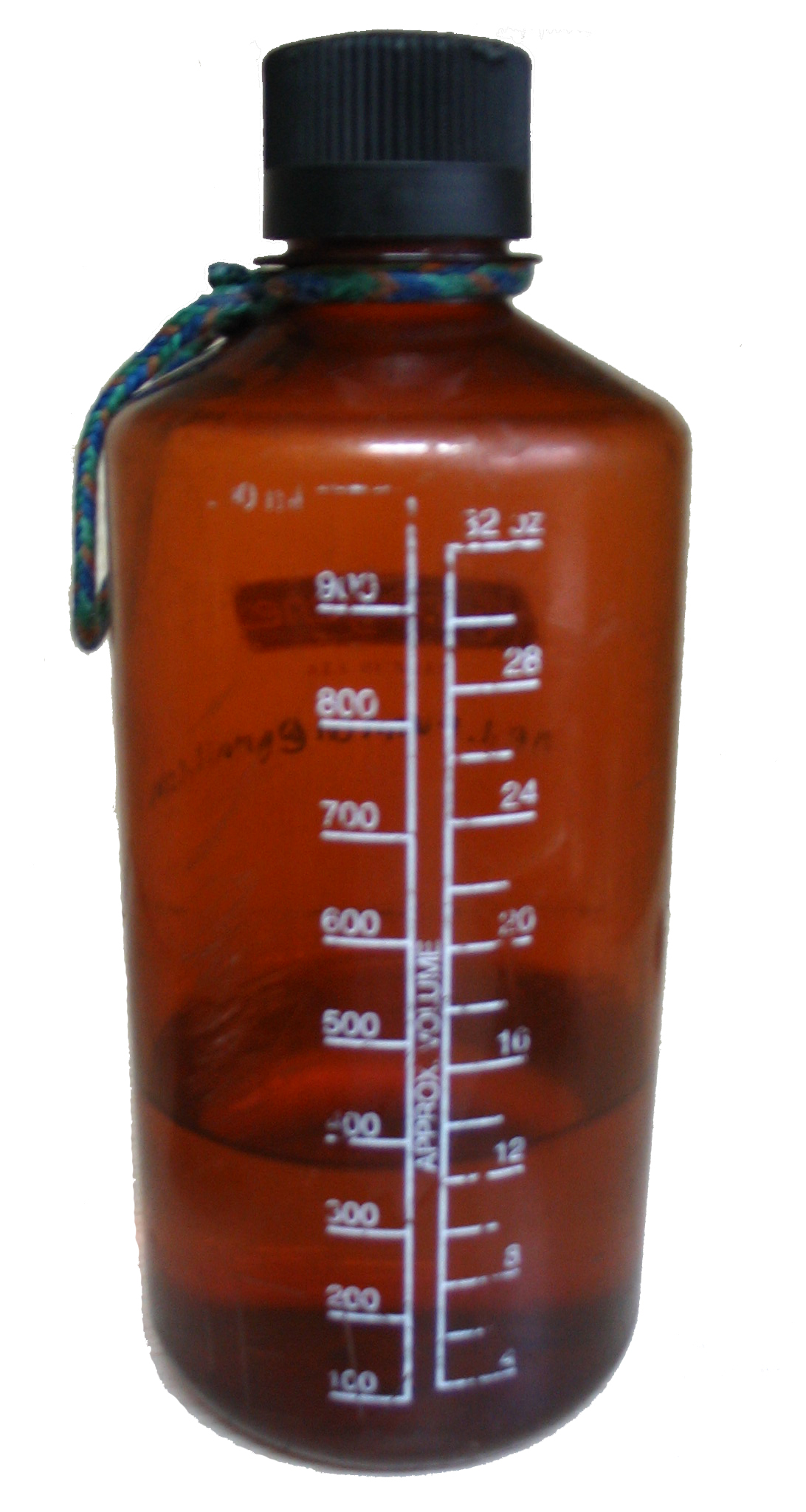
Narrow-mouth Nalgene bottle with custom attachment point

In the 1970s, conservationists began discouraging the disposal of cans and glass bottles by burning and burial in wilderness and recreation areas, and some places began forbidding such materials by regulation. Nalgene products became popular replacements among backpackers for storing consumables; the light, wide-mouthed high-density polyethylene (HDPE) and polycarbonate bottles were more secure than plastic bags and were used for both liquids and solid foods.

Originally, wilderness travelers purchased Nalgene products from laboratory-equipment suppliers, or perhaps gained access to them in their workplaces. Company lore has it that Nalge Company president Marsh Hyman, based in Rochester, New York, discovered that his son's Boy Scout troop was using Nalgene laboratory containers when camping. Since then, the company has re-packaged and marketed items for consumer sales through their line of Nalgene Outdoor products. By the late 1990s, the "Nalgene" trademark was recognized by many hikers, and sales of the 1-litre wide-mouth bottle of translucent polycarbonate (originally typically grey, but now commonly in bright colors, often with custom labels made for the bottle retailer) with a screw-on plastic top that stays attached when the bottle is open, began to increase. Today, many hikers and others recognize the distinctive appearance of Nalgene-branded bottles. Its laboratory pedigree is still suggested by the markings, in hundreds of millilitres, of the volume contained. The materials resist stains and odor absorption, and can be filled with boiling water. The wide-mouth bottle is more widely used and sold over the narrow-mouth bottles in sub-freezing conditions, since it is easier to break through ice with the wider mouth. Currently, Nalgene markets over twelve different sizes of bottles in many colours, including the classic Wide Mouth and Narrow Mouth.

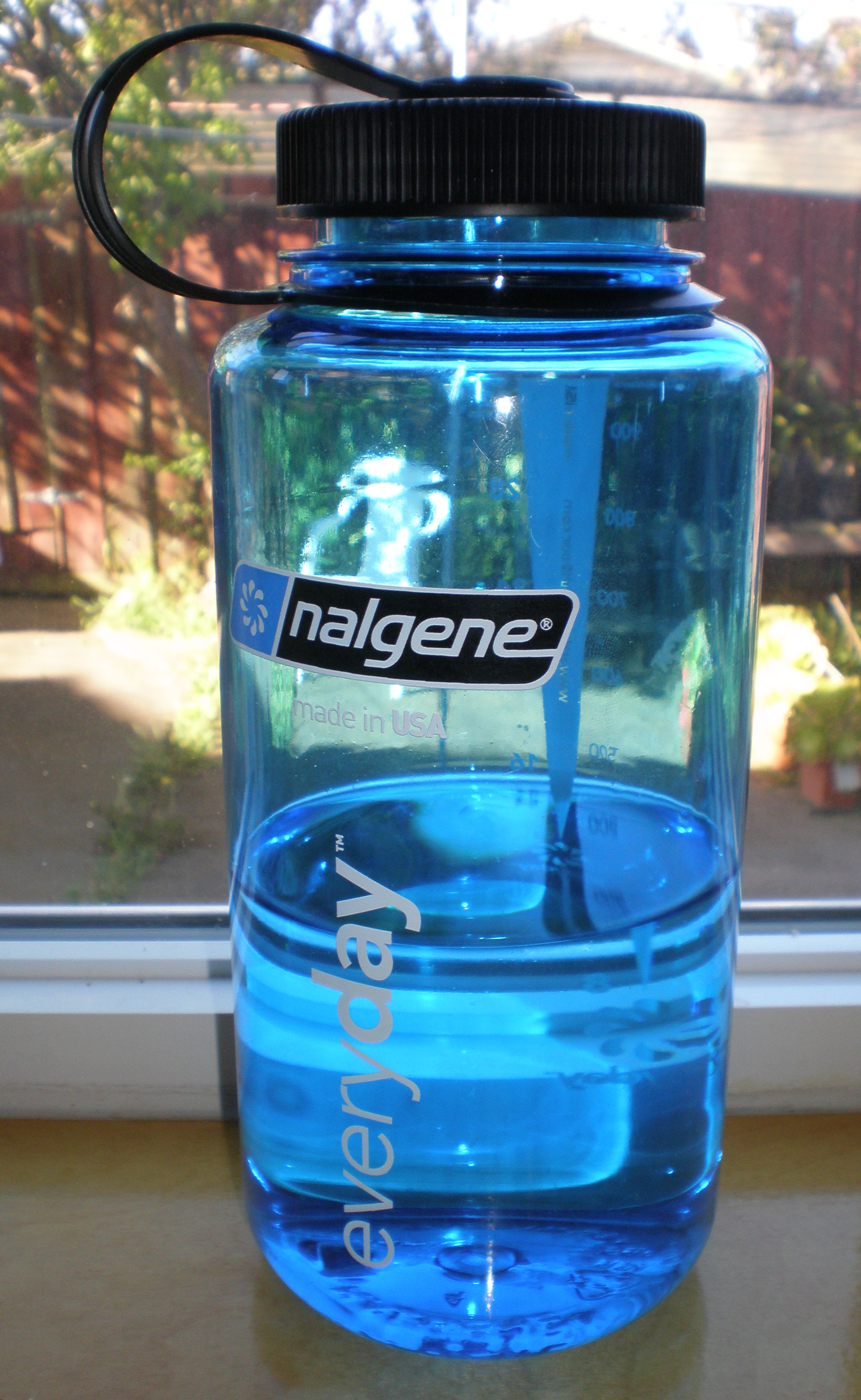
Wide-mouth 1-litre bottle

A variety of products from other manufacturers are designed for compatibility with this item's overall dimensions or its 2.5-inch neck; these include:

- Screw-on water-purifying filters.
- Stainless-steel collapsible-handle cups, for drinking and/or stove-top cooking, that store compactly with a Nalgene litre-bottle nested inside them.
- Insulated Nylon-fabric cases for Nalgene 1-litre bottles; features include stable attachment points and, in most cases, nesting for a cup.
- Snap-in plastic "splash guards" that narrow the neck opening to a size where drinking while in motion is less likely to cause spilling.
- Screw-in filters, which allow the user to add coffee grounds or tea, pour boiling water over the contents, seal the lid, and brew the beverage.
- Screw-on LED lights, creating a usable lantern with low power consumption.

Another widely available Nalgene Outdoor product is a 650 ml (22 fl oz) "All-Terrain" or "bike" bottle. The bottle is made from low-density polyethylene (LDPE), and its screw top has two moving parts—a drinking nozzle that seals until snapped open by pulling on it, and a hinged polycarbonate dome, that when closed both snaps the nozzle closed and protects the nozzle against contamination. Unlike traditional Nalgene containers, this item can be damaged and potentially ruined by filling it with very hot water.

Recently, Nalgene has added hydration systems to its cycling and wilderness product line. The line features 1- to 3-litre bladders with hose-and-bite-valve assemblies in small back-carried packs (mostly under 1000 cubic inches, or 16 L, of additional storage). Nalgene offers the option of two different bladder materials for a choice of superior taste and bacteria resistance versus improved durability. In addition, the bladder on these products can be quickly detached from the hose and pack by a self-sealing connector on the bladder. These features were intended to improve on perceived issues with existing hydration systems, including difficulty filling and/or leaking water into gear that shares the pack.

Increased awareness of the importance of hydration while exercising has led to the appearance of some Nalgene containers in urban and suburban settings like gyms, offices, and campuses. Many colleges give or sell Nalgene water bottles to their students, and Nalgene bottles are also customized and sold as retail promotions.

In October 2017, Nalgene launched a new line of colors for their water bottles.

== Bisphenol A (BPA) concerns ==
In recent years, studies have suggested that polycarbonates, made from bisphenol A (BPA) and phosgene (COCl_{2}), such as the ones Nalgene used, may leach endocrine disruptors including BPA. BPA is a concern because it binds to estrogen receptors, thus altering gene expression. Other research has found that fixatives in polycarbonate plastics can cause chromosomal error in cell division called aneuploidy. Nalgene denies that the quantity leached from their products posed a significant threat to health, and claims these chemicals are only potentially released from Nalgene products when used at temperatures outside of the designed range.

In November 2007, the national Canadian co-operative retailer Mountain Equipment Co-op removed all hard, clear polycarbonate plastic water bottles (including Nalgene-branded products) from their shelves and replaced them with BPA-free Nalgene bottles. In December 2007, Lululemon made a similar move. In May 2008, Recreational Equipment, Inc. removed Nalgene-branded polycarbonate water bottles and replaced them with BPA-free Nalgene bottles.

On April 18, 2008, Health Canada announced that bisphenol A is "'toxic' to human health". On the same date, Nalgene announced it would phase out production of its Outdoor line of polycarbonate containers containing BPA. Nalgene subsequently adopted Tritan copolyester, a BPA-free copolyester made by Eastman Chemical, as a substitute.

Although unpublished studies in 2008 and 2009 by Oregon State students suggest that BPA does not leach from polycarbonate plastic under extreme conditions, BPA is not the only component of plastics which can mimic estrogen and act as an endocrine disruptor. Unfortunately, BPA-free Tritan plastics were later found to leach other estrogenic chemicals in a cell-based assay. Eastman Chemical, the manufacturer of Tritan, will not disclose precise information about the chemical structure of Tritan.

A study from CertiChem (a private lab in Austin, Texas dedicated to studying endocrine disruption) found that green-colored Nalgene bottles effectively block the effects of UV rays, thus rendering the specific model studied safe from specific BPA-leaching concerns. However, CertiChem's founder and neuroscience professor at the University of Texas at Austin, George Bittner, cautioned that green Nalgene bottles found in stores "aren't guaranteed to be safe since minor change to the chemical formula can introduce estrogens". Bittner also published an article claiming most polymers, including Tritan, contained trace amounts of Bisphenol A. Eastman Chemical Company filed a lawsuit after these results were publicized in a brochure produced by PlastiPure, a sister company to CertiChem. Eastman maintained that the tests used by CertiChem, which were based around cultured estrogen-sensitive breast cancer cells, were not a definitive assay of endocrine activity in vivo. A jury ruled in Eastman's favor, and as a result Bittner, PlastiPure, and CertiChem were barred from making claims about Tritan’s oestrogenic activity.

== See also ==
- Cyclobutanediol as an alternative to bisphenol A
- Phthalates
