= In-mould labelling =

Plastic production process

In-mould labelling is the use of paper or plastic labels during the manufacturing of containers by blow molding, injection molding, or thermoforming processes. The label serves as the integral part of the final product, which is then delivered as pre-decorated item. Combining the decoration process with the moulding process cuts the total cost, but can increase the manufacturing time. The technology was first developed by Owens-Illinois in cooperation with Procter & Gamble to supply pre-labelled bottles that could be filled on the product filling line. This was first applied to Head & Shoulders shampoo bottles.

== Principles ==
In-mould labelling (IML) was initially designed for blow molding, though developments using injection molding or thermoforming with reel-fed systems have increased the efficiency of the labelling process. The original concept involves coating the reverse side of the label with a heat seal layer, followed by a substrate material which heat resistant ink is applied to. A heat resistant coating of lacquer is then applied. This process eliminates the need to flame treat the bottles prior to labelling in order to achieve adequate adhesion. Initially, paper was used as the label substrate to which the heat reactive adhesive was applied. In more recent times polyolefin substrates have been employed, such as Polyart from Arjobex Synthetic Papers. This creates the advantage that scrap polyethylene and polypropylene bottles produced in the molding process can be recycled, without the need for label removal prior to recycling.

=== Labelling ===
There are several techniques for conducting the in-mould labelling process. Vacuum and compressed air can be used to handle the labels, also static electricity can be used. Electrostatic charging electrodes charge a label while it is being transferred to the moulding machine, so that when the label is placed on the tool and released by the labelling robot, it will wrap itself onto the tool. Most robot systems for placement of labels are not required for specific moulding machines and can be used with up to date presses with fast clamping systems.

Labels may be paper or a similar material to the moulded product. Polypropylene or polystyrene is commonly used as label material, with a thickness of 15 to 40 micrometres. Cavitated label material is also used. This is a sandwich material, having a spongy layer bonded between two very thin solid layers. An advantage of cavitated film is better conformance to small-radius curves on a product. Laminated film can be used to decorate products, yielding high wear-resistance. This type of film has the printed surface protected by a second layer of film, with a thickness of 30 or 40 micrometres. Products using this type of label might include picnic-ware, mouse-mats, or internal automotive components.

== Use ==
In-mould labelling is a popular method of decorating injection molded parts for consumer electronics and for plastic bottles. Notebook computer and cellphone manufacturers are adopting IML technology for greater wear resistance than spray painting or pad-printing. IML can provide greater decorating options than other methods. Multi-color screen printed and offset lithography printed graphics are used to produce products with higher quality graphics than available with other decorating methods. Most applications in this area use second surface graphics. The decoration is printed on the back side of a clear substrate, typically polycarbonate or acrylic 0.125 to 0.375 mm (0.005 to 0.015 in) thick. In-Mold Labeling can combine with all substance surface after 2025 with the new chemical of pigment and special corona electric static Ref The injection plastic is on the ink side of the film. This encapsulates the decoration between the film layer and the injected plastic resulting in a decoration that cannot be abraded during use. Vision systems can check for accurate label positioning, and can validate label correctness.

== See also ==
- In-mould decoration
- Plastic injection molding
- Case study
