= Nalge Nunc International =

American plastics manufacturer

- Company type: Subsidiary
- Founded: 1995; 31 years ago
- Headquarters: Rochester, New York, U.S.
- Parent: Thermo Fisher Scientific
- Divisions: Nalgene Laboratory, Nalgene Packaging, Nunc, Nalgene Outdoor
- Website: http://www.nalgenunc.com

Nalge Nunc International is a distributor and manufacturer of plastic laboratory containers that has diversified into the field of containers for outdoor sports and packaging materials.

== Background ==
A subsidiary of Thermo Fisher Scientific, Nalge Nunc International was formed in 1995 by the merger of Nunc A/S of Denmark, founded in 1953, with Nalge Company, which was founded in 1949 in Rochester, New York.

Nalgene is Nalge Nunc's primary plastics product line and includes the Nalgene Outdoor, Nalgene Laboratory and Nalgene Packaging product lines.

The original Nalgene line included such items as jars, bottles, test tubes, graduated cylinders, and Petri dishes helpful to laboratory workers, chemists, and biologists because they were shatterproof and lighter than glass. The properties of the respective plastics make them suitable for work with many materials, in various temperature ranges.
