= Plastic bottle =

Narrow-necked container

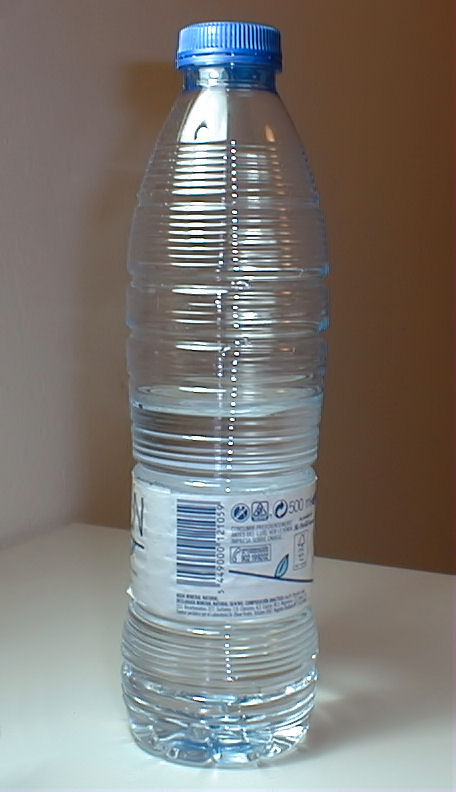
A water bottle. Worldwide, 480 billion plastic drinking bottles were sold in 2017 (and fewer than half were recycled).

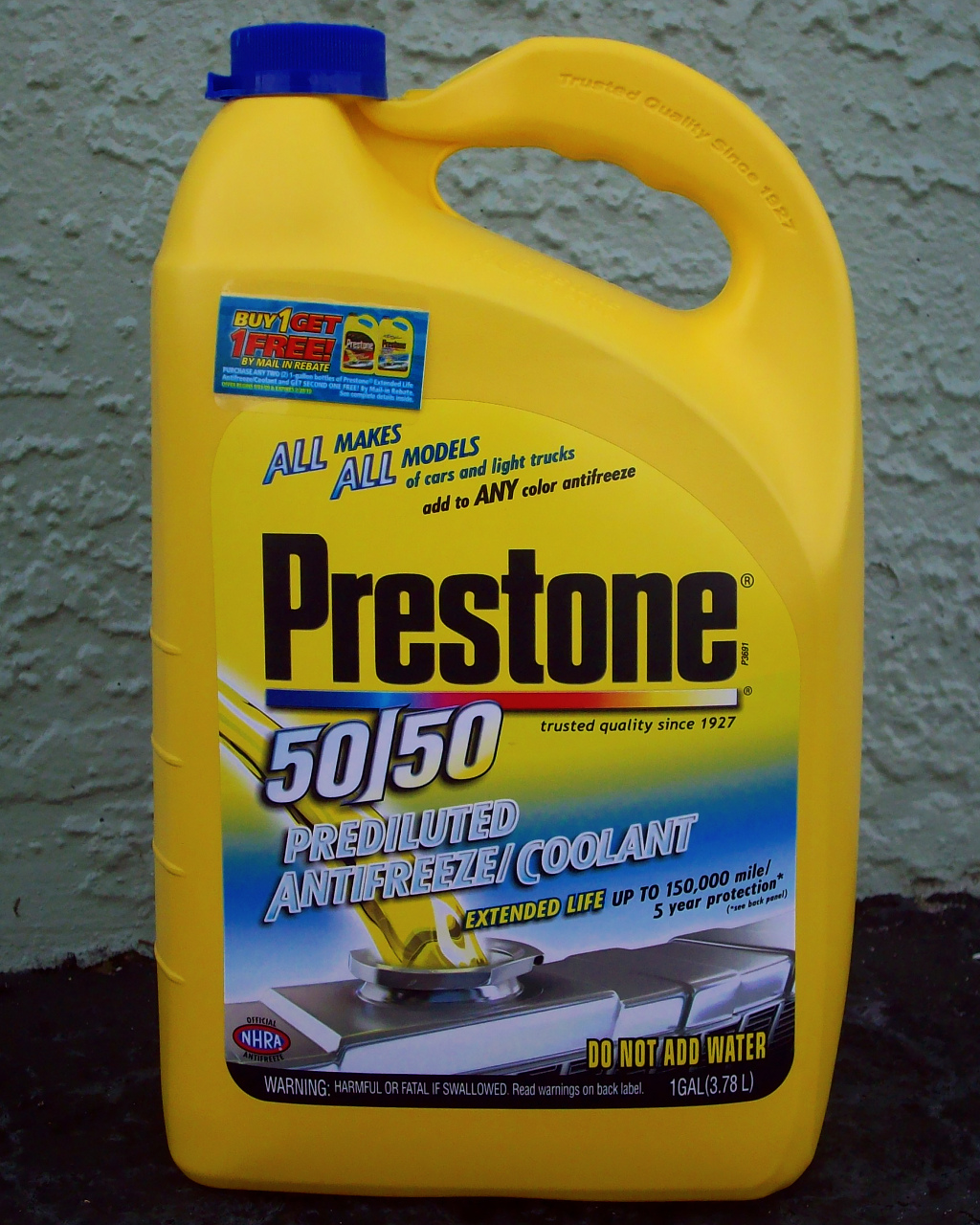
A plastic bottle of antifreeze

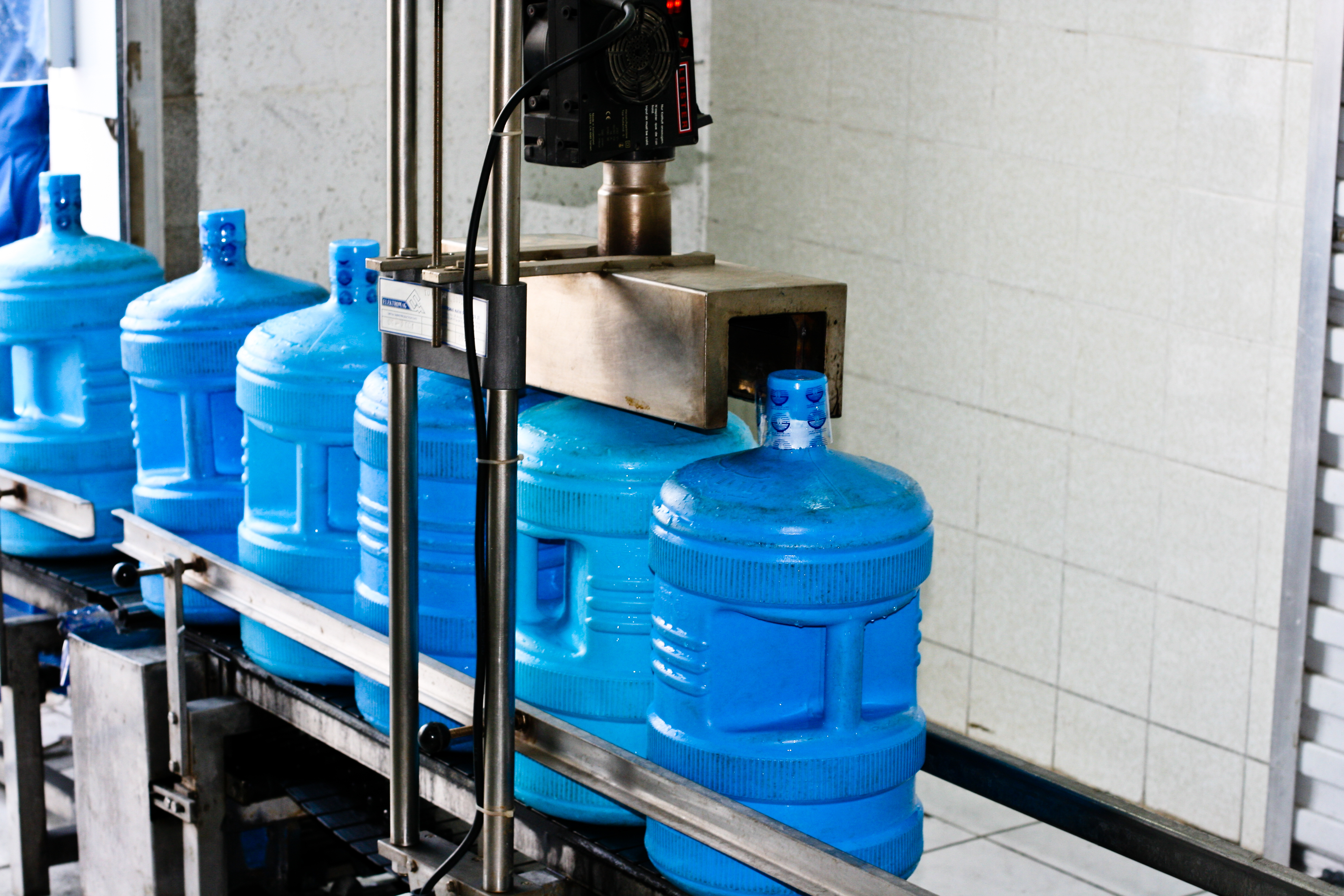
Large plastic bottles of water Single use plastic bottle

A plastic bottle is a bottle constructed from high-density or low-density plastic. They are typically used to store liquids such as water, soft drinks, motor oil, cooking oil, medicine, shampoo or milk. They range from very small bottles to large carboys. Consumer blow molded containers often have integral handles or are shaped to facilitate grasping.

Plastic was invented in the nineteenth century and was originally used to replace common materials such as ivory, rubber, and shellac. Plastic bottles were first used commercially in 1947, but remained impractical until the 1970s, when the PET bottle was introduced. They quickly became popular with manufacturers and customers because they are lighter, cheaper and easier to transport than glass bottles and less susceptible to corrosion than metal containers. However, their greatest advantage over glass bottles is their superior resistance to breakage, in both production and transportation. Except for wine and beer, the food industry internationally has largely replaced glass bottles with plastic bottles.

== Production ==
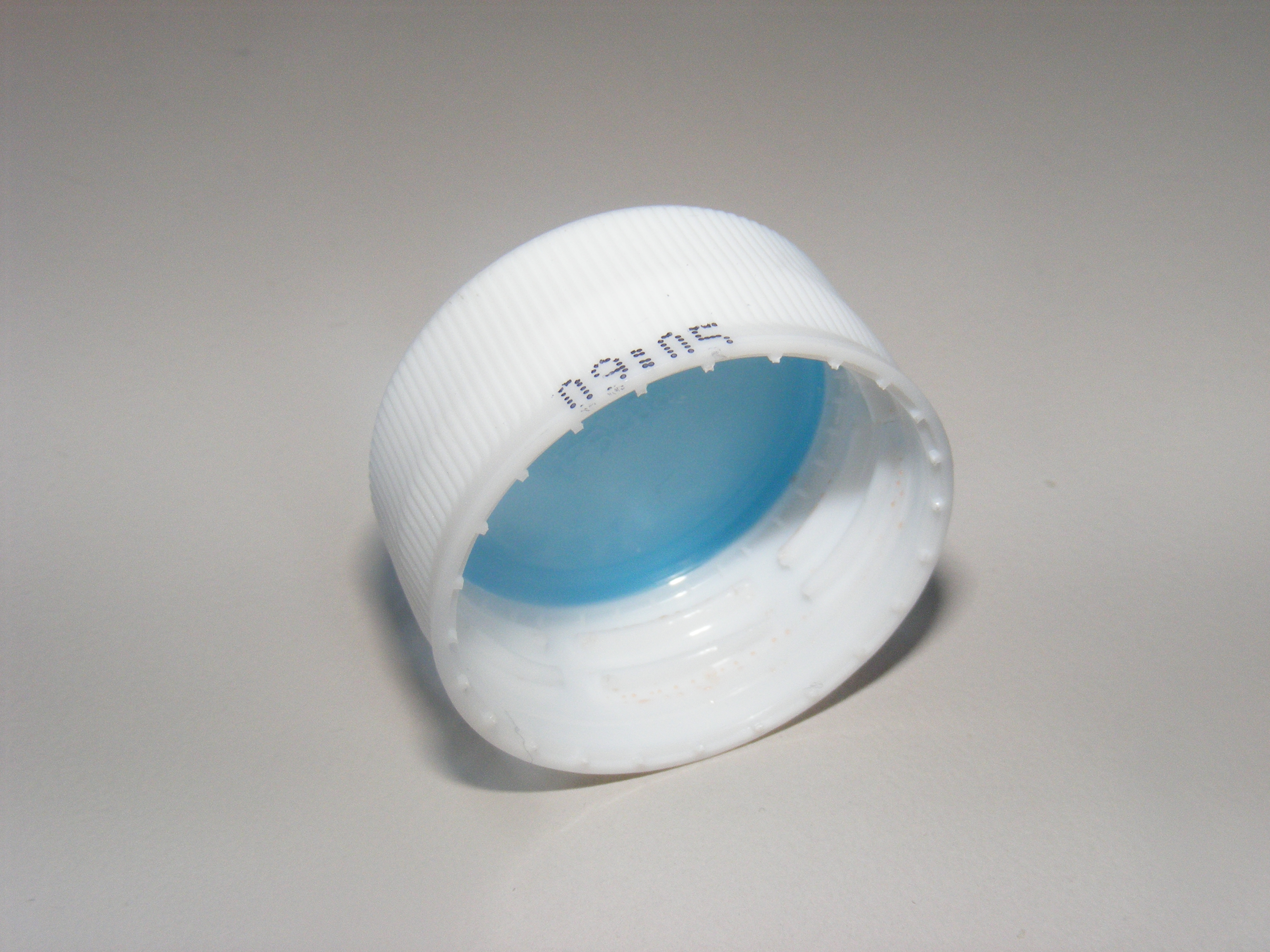
A polypropylene bottle cap

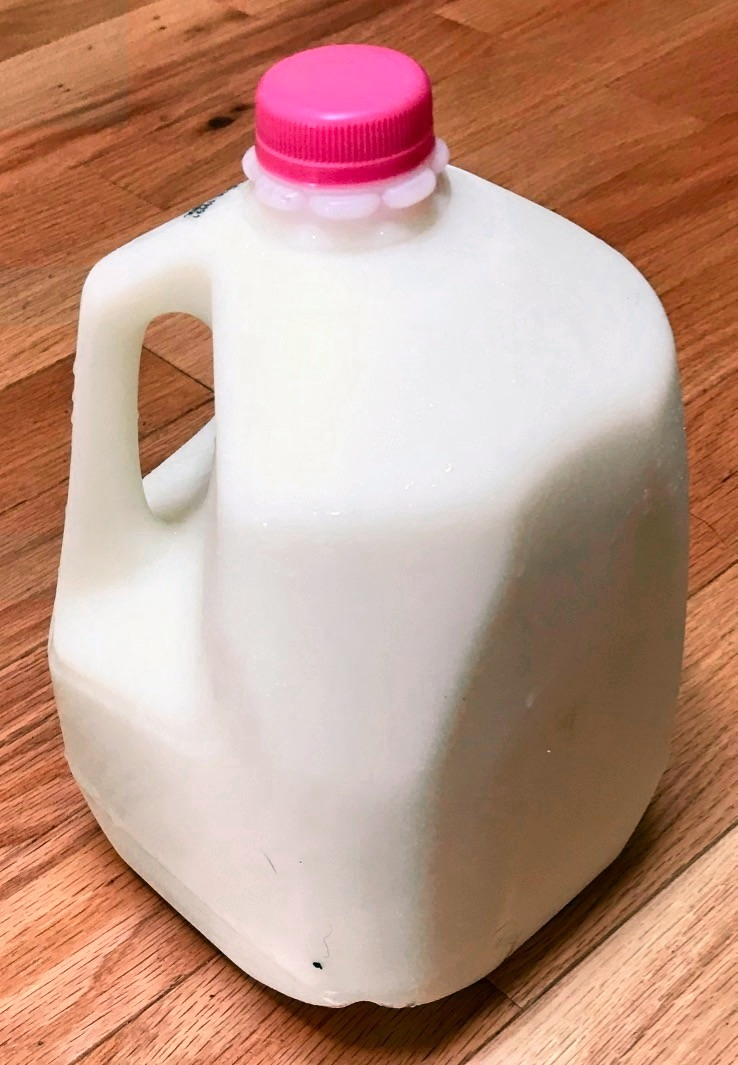
Plastic bottle of milk: HDPE Recycling Code 2

The materials used in the manufacture of plastic bottles vary by application.

=== Petrochemical resins ===
High-density polyethylene (HDPE)
HDPE is the most widely used resin for plastic bottles. This material is economical, impact resistant, and provides a good moisture barrier. HDPE is compatible with a wide range of products including acids and caustics but is not compatible with solvents. It is supplied in FDA-approved food grade. HDPE is naturally translucent and flexible. The addition of color will make HDPE opaque, but not glossy. HDPE lends itself to silk screen decoration. While HDPE provides good protection at below freezing temperatures, it cannot be used with products filled above 190 °F (88 °C) or products requiring a hermetic (vacuum) seal.
Fluorine-treated HDPE
These bottles are exposed to fluorine gas in a secondary operation, are similar in appearance to HDPE, and serve as a barrier to hydrocarbons and aromatic solvents. Fluorine-treated bottles may contain insecticides, pesticides, herbicides, photographic chemicals, agricultural chemicals, household and industrial cleaners, electronic chemicals, medical cleaners and solvents, citrus products, d-limonene, flavors, fragrances, essential oils, surfactants, polishes, additives, graffiti cleaning products, pre-emergents, stone and tile care products, waxes, paint thinner, gasoline, biodiesel, xylene, acetone, kerosene and more.
Low-density polyethylene (LDPE)
LDPE is similar in composition to HDPE. It is less rigid and generally less chemically resistant than HDPE, but is more translucent. LDPE is used primarily for squeeze applications. LDPE is significantly more expensive than HDPE.
Polyethylene terephthalate (PET, PETE) / Polyester
This resin is commonly used for carbonated beverages, water bottles, and food packaging. PET provides very good alcohol and essential oil barrier properties, generally good chemical resistance (although acetones and ketones will attack PET), and a high degree of impact resistance and tensile strength. The orienting process serves to improve gas and moisture barrier properties and impact strength. This material is not resistant at high temperature. Its maximum temperature is 200 °F (93 °C).
Polycarbonate (PC)
PC is a clear plastic used to make bottles for milk and water. Five-gallon water bottles are a common application of PC.
Polypropylene (PP)
PP is used primarily for jars and closures. It is rigid and is a barrier to moisture. Polypropylene is stable at temperatures up to 220 °F (104 °C). It is autoclavable and offers the potential for steam sterilization. The compatibility of PP with high filling temperatures is responsible for its use with hot fill products. PP has excellent chemical resistance, but provides poor impact resistance in cold temperatures.
Polystyrene (PS)
PS is transparent and rigid. It is commonly used with dry products, including vitamins, petroleum jellies, and spices. Polystyrene does not provide good barrier properties, and exhibits poor impact resistance.
Polyvinyl chloride (PVC)
PVC is naturally clear. It has high resistance to oils and transmits very little oxygen. It provides a strong barrier to most gases, and its drop-impact resistance is also very good. This material is chemically resistant, but it is vulnerable to some solvents. PVC has poor resistance to high temperatures and will distort at 160 °F (71 °C), making it incompatible with hot-filled products. It has attained notoriety in recent years due to potential health risks.
Post-consumer resin (PCR)
PCR is a blend of reclaimed natural HDPE (primarily from milk and water containers) and virgin resin. The recycled material is cleaned, ground and recompounded into uniform pellets along with prime virgin material especially designed to build up environmental stress crack resistance. PCR has no odor but exhibits a slight yellow tint in its natural state. This tint can be hidden by the addition of color. PCR is easily processed and inexpensive. However, it cannot be used in direct contact with food or pharmaceutical products. PCR can be produced in a variety of recycled content percentages up to 100%.
K-Resin (SBC)
SBC is a highly transparent, high-gloss, impact-resistance resin. K-Resin, a styrene derivative, is processed on polyethylene equipment. It is specifically incompatible with fats and unsaturated oils or solvents. This material is frequently used for display and point-of-purchase packaging.

=== Other materials ===
Bioplastic
A bioplastic is a polymer structure based on processed biological materials rather than petrochemicals. Bioplastics are commonly made from renewable sources like starch, vegetable oil, and less commonly, chicken feathers. The idea behind bioplastic is to create a plastic that has the ability to biodegrade.
Bisphenol A (BPA)
BPA is a synthetic compound that serves as a raw material in the manufacturing of such plastics as polycarbonates and epoxy resins. It is commonly found in reusable drink containers, food storage containers, canned foods, children's toys and cash register receipts. BPA can seep into food or beverages from containers that are made with BPA.
Acrylonitrile
Acrylonitrile is an organic compound and one of the components of acrylonitrile butadiene styrene plastic. Acrylonitrile bottles were introduced in 1974 by The Coca-Cola Company to replace glass, but were banned in the United States by the Food and Drug Administration (FDA) after showing adverse health effects in animal studies.

== Neck and thread ==
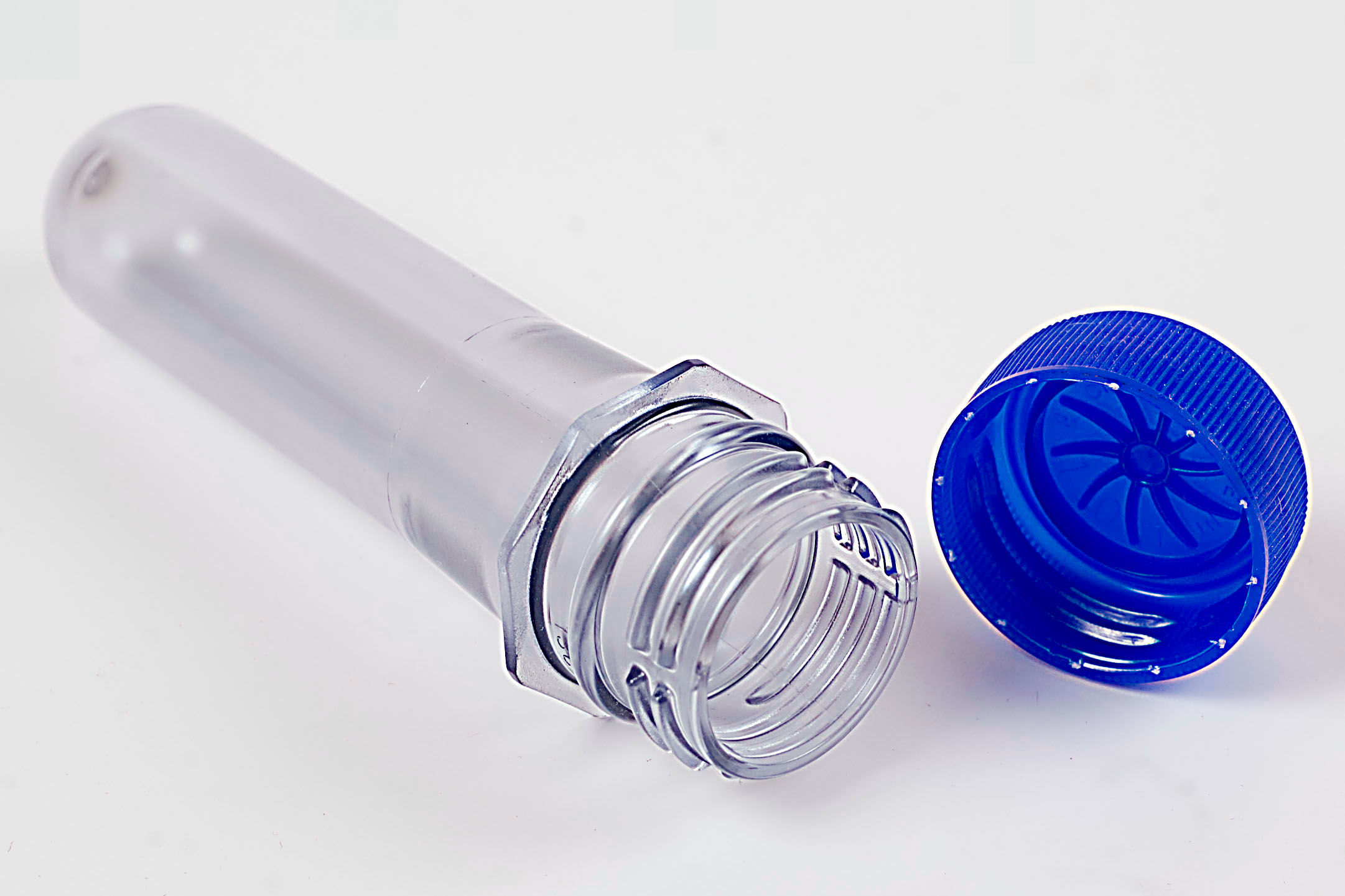
PET bottle preform before blow molding, filling and labeling, showing the PCO 1881 finish with matching cap

The neck of a plastic bottle is the funnel through which liquid is added and removed. It normally features a standardized thread for screwing a screw cap on.

=== PCO 1881 ===
The 28 mm PET bottle neck finish used in almost all PET beverage bottles worldwide is standardized as PCO 1881 (where "PCO" stands for Plastic Closure Only) It was established as a voluntary guideline standard by the International Society of Beverage Technologists (ISBT), following industry collaborative design efforts initiated in 2007 and finalized in 2009. The PCO 1881 finish was engineered as a lightweight, short-neck successor to the older, taller PCO 1810 standard.

The total finish height is 17 mm, with a functional neck height of 13.5 mm. The plastic neck finish weight is 3.8 g. The finish utilizes interrupted threads that serve as vent slots. These allow carbon dioxide gas in the bottle to safely depressurize before the cap completely disengages during unscrewing. It features a relatively short thread engagement (about 1.5 to 1.75 turns).

While primarily designed for pressurized carbonated soft drink (CSD) and sparkling beverage containers, the PCO 1881 standard has also been adopted across still water and juice production lines to unify packaging machinery and supply chain requirements.

== Concerns ==
There is ongoing concern as to the use of plastics in consumer food packaging solutions, environmental impact of the disposal of these products, as well as concerns regarding consumer safety. Karin Michaels, Associate Professor at Harvard Medical School, suggests that toxins leaching from plastics might be related to disorders in humans such as endocrine disruption. Aluminum and cyanide were found as trace elements in the examined samples, which are considered to be toxic elements according to the American FDA. In the United States, plastic water bottles are regulated by the FDA, which also inspects and samples bottled water plants periodically. Plastic water bottle plants hold a low priority for inspection due to a continuously good safety record. In the past, the FDA maintained that there was a lack of human data showing plastics pose health problems. However, in January 2010, the FDA reversed its opinion saying they now have concerns about health risks.

It is a common misconception that drinking from plastic water bottles increases cancer risk; there is no such risk.

=== Microplastics ===
An article published on 6 November 2017 in Water Research reported on the content of microplastics in mineral waters packed in plastic or glass bottles, or beverage cartons. In 2018, research conducted by Sherri Mason from the State University of New York in Fredonia revealed the presence of polypropylene, polystyrene, nylon and polyethylene terephthalate microparticles in plastic bottles. Polypropylene was thereby found to be the most common polymeric material (54%) and nylon the second most abundant (16%) polymeric material. The study also mentioned that polypropylene and polyethylene are polymers that are often used to make plastic bottle caps. Also, 4% of retrieved plastic particles were found to have signatures of industrial lubricants coating the polymer. The research was reviewed by Andrew Mayes of the University of East Anglia (UEA) School of Chemistry The European Food Safety Authority suggested most microplastics are excreted by the body; however, the Food and Agriculture Organization, a specialised agency of the United Nations, warned that it is possible that the smallest particles (< 1.5 μm) could enter the bloodstream and organs, via the intestinal wall. Microplastics have been observed to cross the blood-brain barrier, found in semen, testes, and placenta tissue.

== Labelling ==
The resin identification code for PET plastic products

Plastic bottles are marked at their base with the resin identification code to indicate the material used.

Product labels are attached with adhesive or are shrunk to fit. In-mould labelling is a process of building the label into the bottle during molding.

== Speciality types ==
=== Collapsible bottle ===
An accordion bottle or collapsible bottle is a plastic bottle designed to store darkroom chemicals or any other chemical that is highly susceptible to oxidation. They work by being able to squeeze down to remove excess air from the bottle to extend the life of the product. An alternate benefit is minimizing storage, transportation, or disposal space when the bottle is empty or as the content is being dispersed, for example with water bottles used by hikers. Collapsing can also keep foods fresher.

=== Carbonated drinks bottles ===
Bottles, used for storing carbonated water and soft drinks, has an uneven bottom for stability reasons. The technology was developed and patented by Domas Adomaitis in the United States in 1971.

Although carbonated soda bottles were designed for holding beverages, they have been used for other purposes. For example, in poor countries, empty two-liter soda bottles have been reused as an improvised personal flotation device to prevent drowning.

== See also ==
- Bottle wall
- Boil-in-bag
- Drink can
- Glass bottle
- In-mould labelling
- List of bottle types, brands and companies
- Packaging
- Plastic pollution
- PET bottle recycling
- Plastics Industry Association
- Squeeze bottle
- Tetra Brik
- Wash bottle
- Windowfarm
- History of bottle recycling in the United States
