= In-mould decoration =

In-mould decoration, a special type of plastic molding, is used for decorating plastic surfaces with color and/or with an abrasion resistant coat.

== Principle ==
A carrier film is placed inside the opened mould. It carries the dried paint layers which are to be transferred to the plastic part, with the paint facing the gate. After filling with plastic the paint adheres to the plastic, and is removed from the carrier when opening the mould. For the next cycle the carrier film is advanced, positioning the next area to be transferred.

== Mold construction ==
The mould must be constructed so that the back side of the carrier film rests against a flat wall. The plastic film can be bent slightly, but the more it is bent, the greater the risk of wrinkles. The filling only takes place on the other side, the side of the carrier with the material to be transferred. The part has to stay on the side of the gate. The tips of the ejectors are usually bent slightly to ensure the parts stick to them.

== Carrier film feeder ==
To place the carrier quickly in the mold, the carrier film is wound on a coil. The full supply roll is above the mold, and the take-up roll beneath. Usually the film feeder is attached to the moving side of the mold, to enable de-molding when opening the mold.

== Cleaning of the parts ==
Remnants from the paint ("flakes") must be removed from the parts. This is usually done by rotating brushes.

== See also ==
- In-mould labelling
