= Wash bottle =

Style of squeeze bottle for laboratory use

Lab Wash Bottles
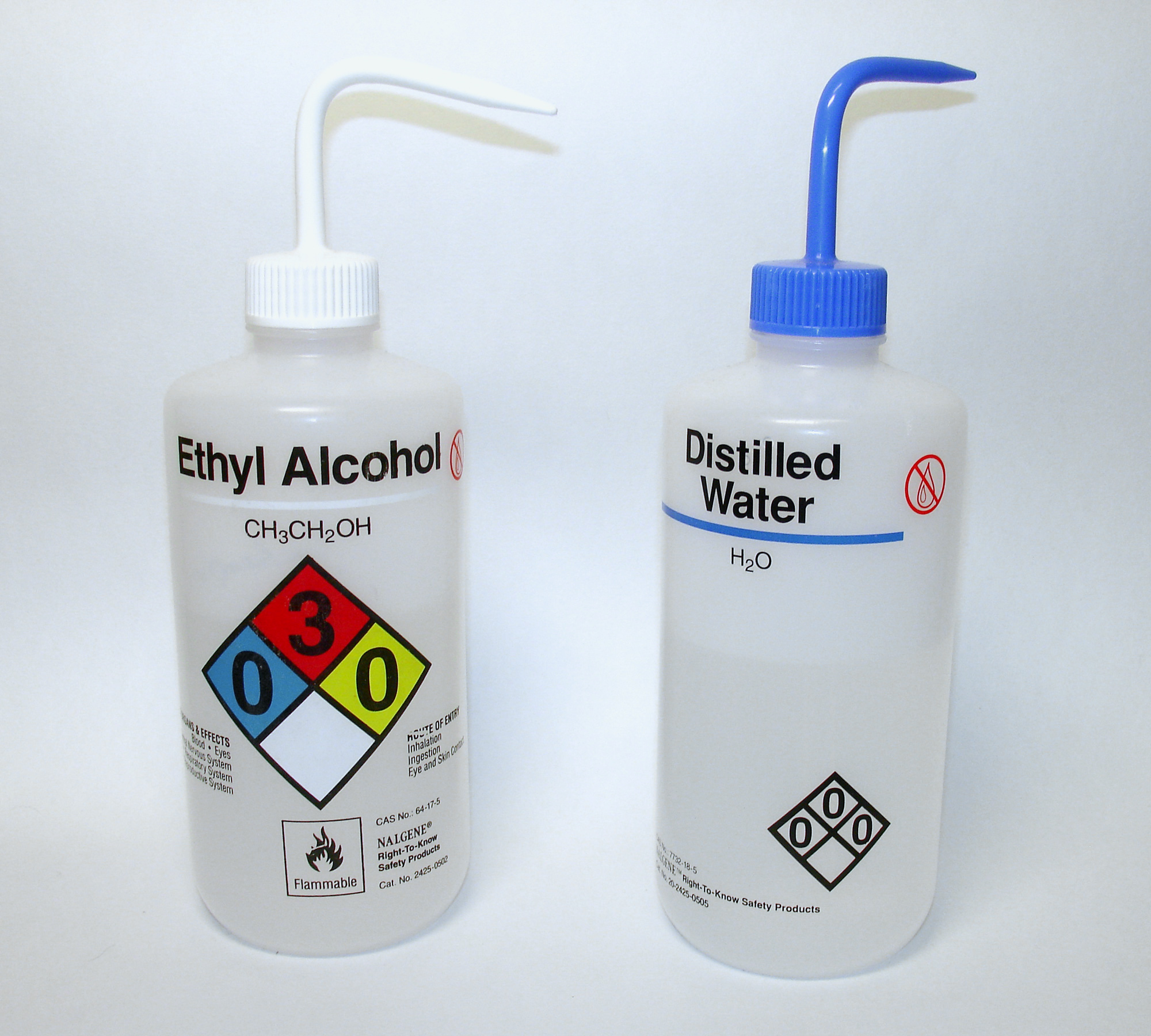
- Plastic wash bottles for ethanol and water
- Other names: Squeeze Bottle
- Uses: To clean laboratory glassware and other equipment. They are filled with appropriate cleaning liquids, and poured over the tool that needs to be cleaned.
- Notable experiments: The wash bottle is generally used in the clean-up phase of many experiments

A wash bottle is a squeeze bottle with a nozzle, used to rinse various pieces of laboratory glassware, such as test tubes and round bottom flasks.

Wash bottles are sealed with a screw-top lid. When hand pressure is applied to the bottle, the liquid inside becomes pressurized and is forced out of the nozzle into a narrow stream of liquid.

Most wash bottles are made up of polyethylene, which is a flexible solvent-resistant petroleum-based plastic. Most bottles contain an internal dip tube allowing upright use.

Wash bottles may be filled with a range of common laboratory solvents and reagents, according to the work to be undertaken. These include deionized water, detergent solutions and rinse solvents such as acetone, isopropanol or ethanol. In biological labs it is common to keep sodium hypochlorite solution in a wash bottle to disinfect unneeded cultures.

== Colour codes ==
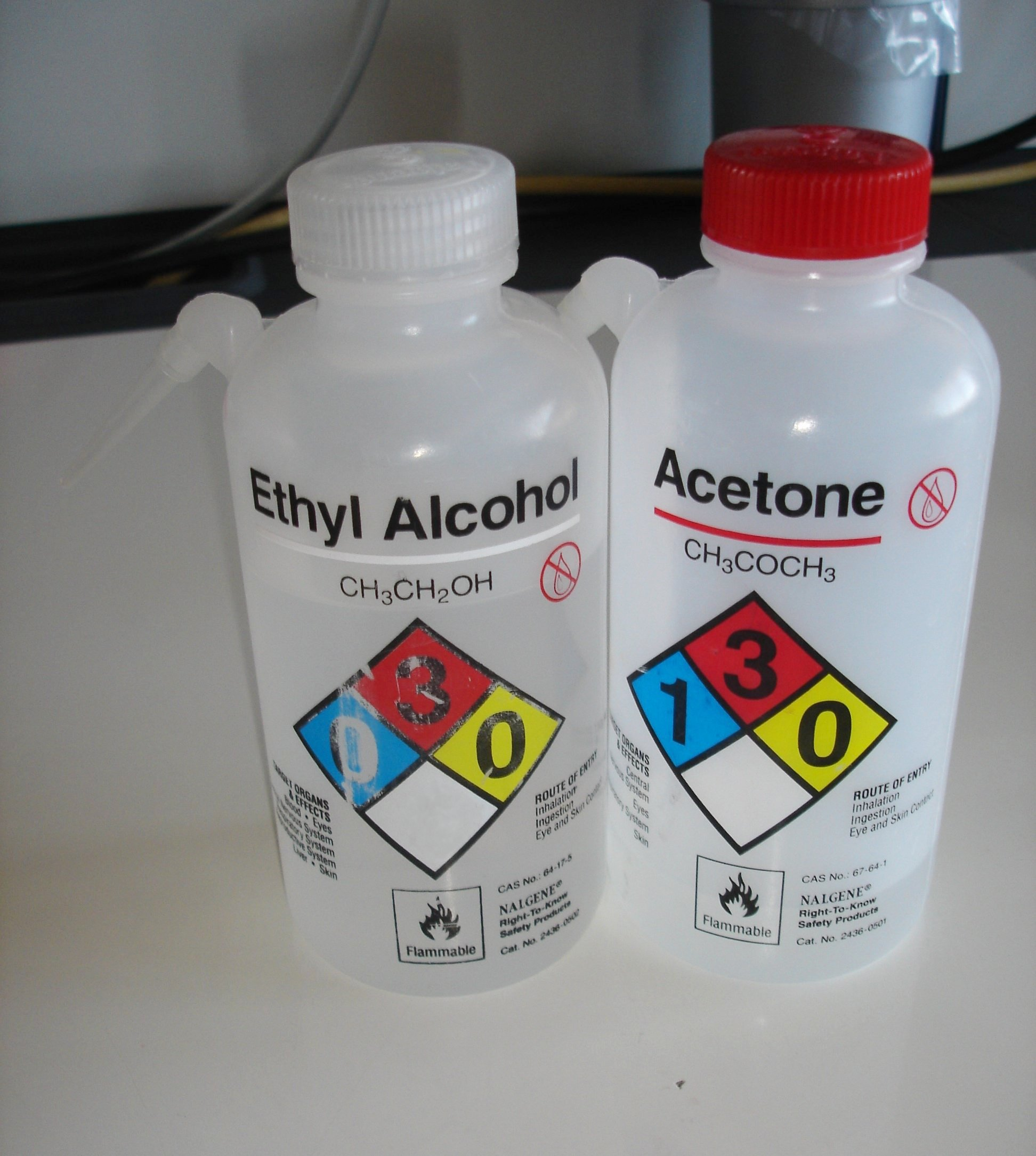
White top for ethyl alcohol (ethanol), red top for acetone, also with NFPA 704 hazard markings. Nozzle and dip tube built into the bottle

There are a consistent set of colour codes and markings used to identify the contents of wash bottles. Red is used for acetone, White for ethanol or sodium hypochlorite or distilled water, green for Methanol, yellow for isopropanol and blue for distilled water.

=== Safety ===
Safety warning labels are also used to identify potential hazards. Where reagents with high vapour pressure are used such as ethanol or methanol, small pressure release holes are incorporated into the cap to release and excess vapour pressure and avoid material being ejected through the nozzle when not in use.

== Advantages ==
The use of wash bottles helps researchers control and measure the precise amount of liquid used. In addition, unwanted substances or particles cannot pass through wash bottles. The use of wash bottles is more convenient than using beaker and graduated cylinders.

== Types ==
Different types of wash bottles are suitable with different types of substances. A spiral gas-lift wash bottle, for example, is suitable for eliminating gas with the liquid system having two phases like bromide and water. In addition, a Simple graduated wash bottle helps determine the amount of liquid used. A type of strong solvent and a type of destructive substance can be dealt with Nalgene Teflon FEP wash bottles since the special type of plastic is used to produce this type of wash bottles.

== Storage ==
Wash bottles are typically kept on the laboratory bench in a secure way so that they can be easily located and so that they do not interfere with other work taking place. Such containment may be by the use of two ring clamps which have similar size attached to a lattice rod.
