= Pressy Button =

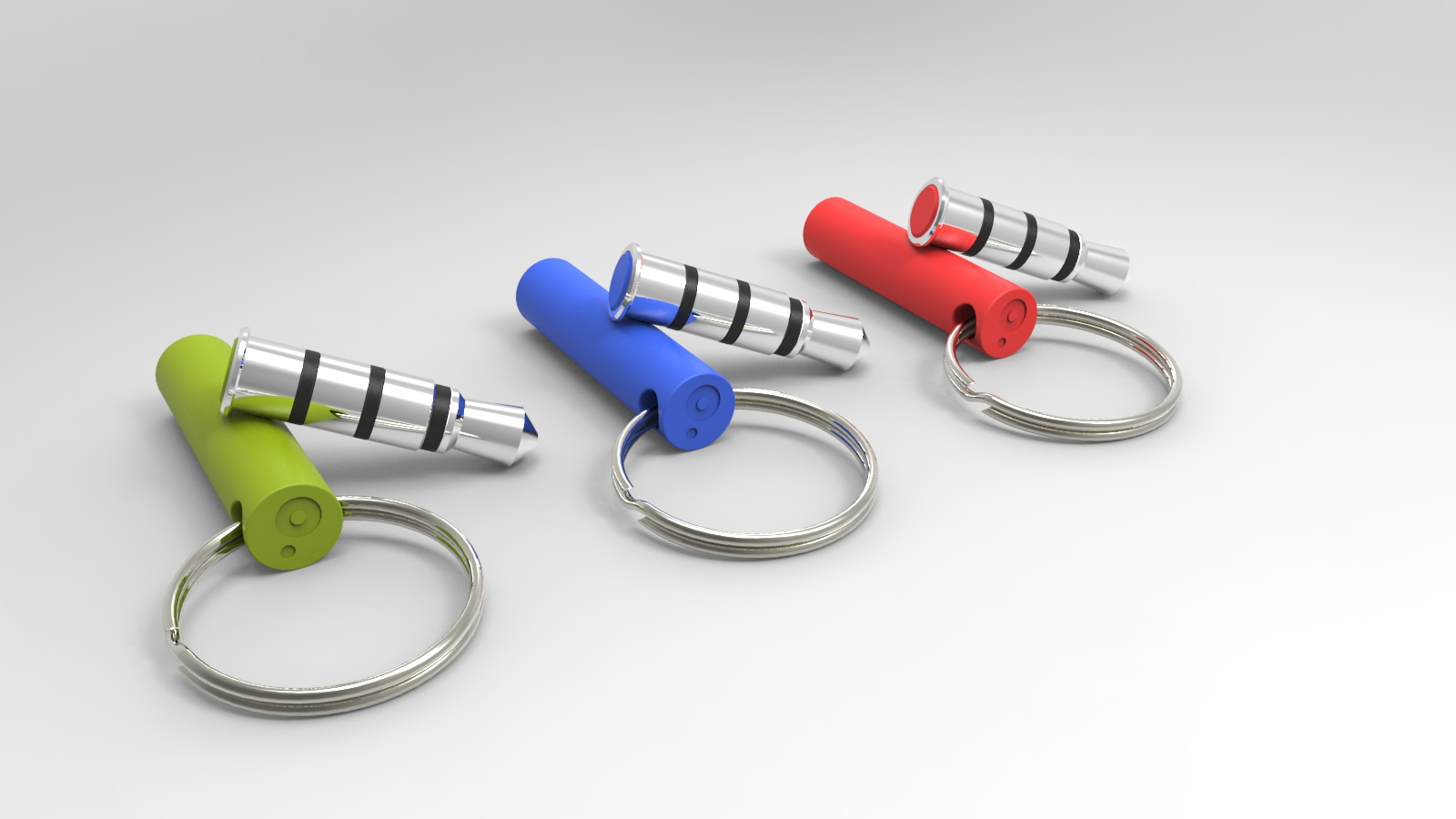
- Three Pressy Buttons with keyring sheaths
- Also known as: Pressy; Almighty Android Button
- Developer: Boaz Mendel, Nimrod Back, Geva Tal
- Type: Add-on programmable button
- Released: July 2014
- Website: pressybutton.com (dead)

Pressy Button or Pressy is a programmable button that can be inserted into the headphone socket of a smartphone or tablet and used as an extra button to perform tasks on the device.

A Kickstarter campaign was launched in August 2013 to raise funds for Pressy. The campaign ended on October 15 with a total of $695,138 pledged. The devices were expected to be shipped out by April 2014, but Pressy was delayed and released in July 2014.

== Background ==
=== Funding ===
The Kickstarter campaign of Pressy was launched on August 29, 2013 with a stated goal of securing a funding of $40,000 in 47 days. After being featured on multiple blogs and media outlets, the Kickstarter campaign went viral. Pressy surpassed the $40,000 goal in less than 24 hours and acquired more than four-times of its goal in two days. The campaign closed on October 15 with a total of $695,138 pledged from 28,818 backers.

For a $17 pledge, donors were offered the button and the application, and for a pledge of $25, a choice of colors with a keyring storage sheath was offered. Those who pledged $45 would receive a gold-coated Pressy button with a matching keyring holder. A special pledge of $1000 was available for developers that would allow them API implementation. By the end of the campaign, there was only one backer for the $1,000 pledge.

=== Development ===
Pressy was developed by Nimrod Back and Boaz Mendel. According to Back, he came up with the idea of Pressy after having developed several applications in 2013 and "noticing that my awesome devices are lacking the most intuitive input – a button click." Back then quit his day job of an application developer, teamed up with his friend Boaz Mendel, a product designer, and started working on the development of the Pressy.

By late 2013, the team had many working prototypes and models of the button, all of which were made using 3D printing.

== Device ==
Pressy can be plugged into a phone's headphone socket. The button links with the Pressy application and when pressed can be used to access various functions in the phone. The application works by running on Android as a background service. The application monitors the headset jack, but only operates when Pressy is clicked.

Pressy is available in four colors - black, blue, red, and white. The device comes with a key-ring carrier that can be used to keep the device when not being used. Pressy application can also be accessed through the media button on headphones when headphones are plugged into the phone.

=== Compatibility ===
The application is only available for Android. According to Back, they will not release an iOS application for Pressy due to restrictions on the API. However, in an interview, he said that "We hope our developers community builds an app compatible with iOS." Pressy can work on any device running Android 2.3 or newer.

=== Features ===
The button is configured so that different actions are implemented following different rhythms or durations of the click. To add an action, a user clicks the plus sign in the Pressy app, selects the action type, customizes the click length and sequence, and then customizes the action. Pressy can be set to perform multiple functions by defining what happens with single or double

== In the media ==
When the Kickstarter campaign of Pressy was launched in August 2013, it was featured in multiple publications and technology blogs. The Next Web wrote "Early adopters snapped up all the Pressy buttons available for $15, making $17 the lowest tier you can get in on the deal."

Pressy was featured in 10 Kickstarter Projects You will be Buying in 2014 in Tech Radar. The article also mentioned that one of Tech Radar's employees had bought the button. Pressy was also featured in Five start-ups that are set to launch some crazy gizmos in 2014 in Indiatimes.

== Controversy ==
The Pressy team initiated a design change to the Pressy key-chain holder after the project was funded, which evoked mixed response among the backers. On June 4, 2014, a customer service representative for Pressy posted on the company's Facebook page that the companion application would not be offered through the Google Play store and would need to be sideloaded. The news contradicted prior promises made to Kickstarter Backers that the application would be available through the Google Play store, and backers voiced their concern on Pressy's social media outlets. Pressy later said that the representative made an error, and that the application would be offered through the Google Play Store as previously reported, attaching photos of pre-printed packages containing the Google Play logo as a proof.
