= Nalge Company =

- Industry: Manufacturing
- Founded: Rochester, New York, U.S. (1949)
- Founder: Emanuel Goldberg
- Fate: Merged
- Successor: Nalge Nunc International
- Headquarters: Rochester, New York, U.S.
- Products: Plastics

Nalge Company was founded in 1949 by chemist Emanuel Goldberg of Rochester, New York. The company merged with Nunc A/S in 1995 to form Nalge Nunc International.
