= Screen protector =

Sheet of clear material

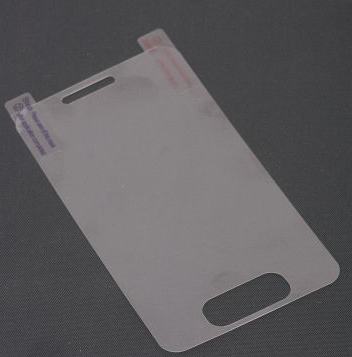
A screen protector, yet to be installed

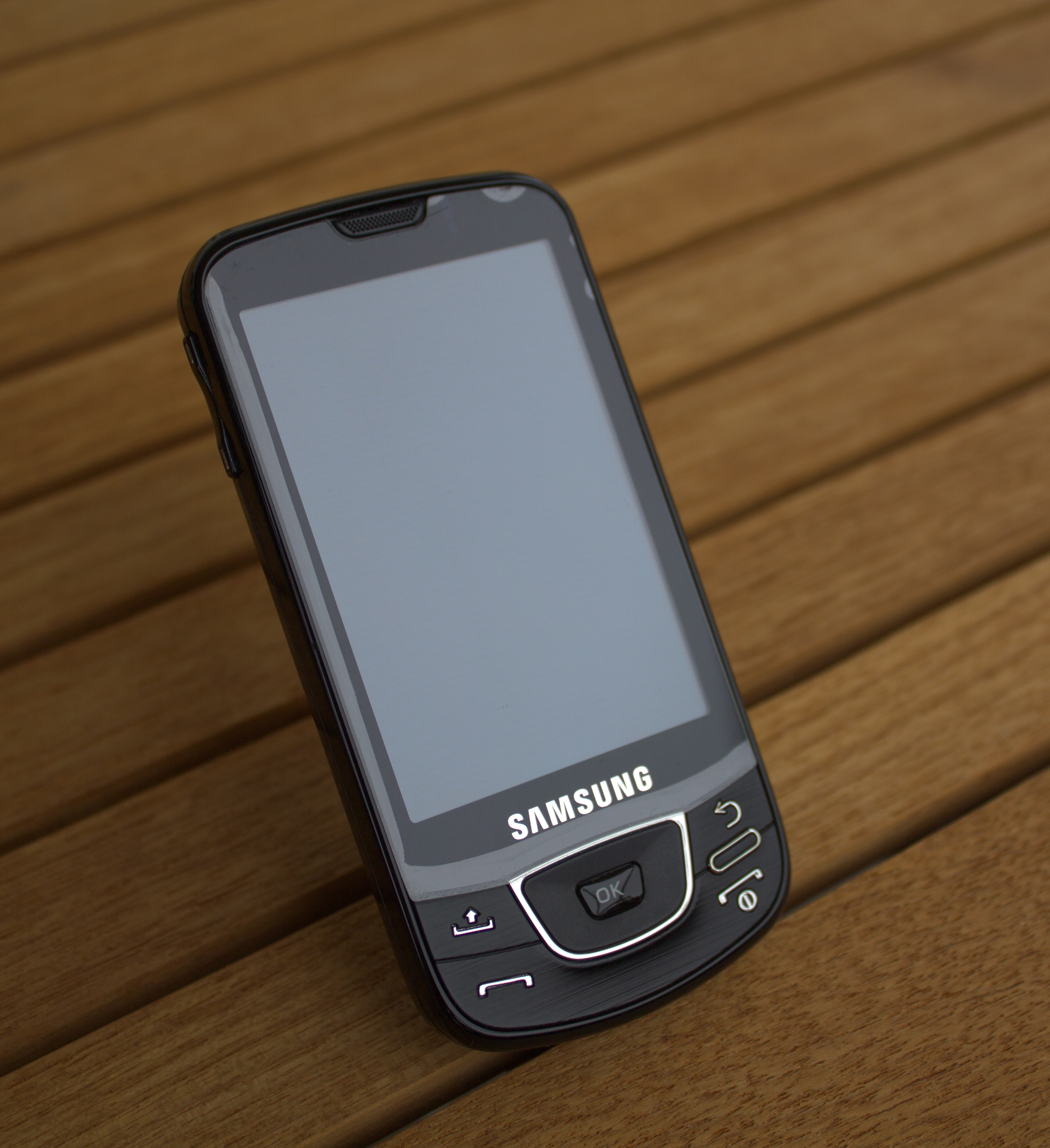
A smartphone with a screen protector installed

A screen protector is an additional sheet of material commonly made from polyurethane or laminated glass that can be attached to the screen of an electronic device and protect it against physical damage.

== History ==
The first screen protector was designed and patented by Herbert Schlegel in 1968 for use on television screens.

In 1990s, the CRT screen protectors were used on CRT monitors for anti-glare and anti-radiation purposes. Later, they were adapted for use on LCD monitors.

Screen protectors first entered the mobile-device market after the rise of personal digital assistants (PDAs). Since PDAs were often operated via a stylus, the tip of the stylus could scratch the sensitive LCD screen surface. Therefore, screen protectors provided sacrificial protection from this damage. Since then, the ubiquity of mobile-devices have seen the screen protector become more widely used.

== Materials ==
Screen protectors are made of either plastics, such as polyethylene terephthalate (PET) or thermoplastic polyurethane (TPU), or of laminated tempered glass, similar to the device’s original screen they are meant to protect. Plastic screen protectors cost less than glass and are thinner (around 0.1 mm (0.004 in) thick, compared to 0.3 to 0.5 mm (0.012 to 0.020 in) for glass) and more flexible. At the same price, glass will resist scratches better than plastic and feel more like the device's screen, though higher priced plastic protectors may be better than the cheapest tempered glass models, since glass will shatter or crack with sufficient impact force. Flexible polymer-based screen protectors have also been shown to dissipate impact energy differently from rigid tempered glass, with viscoelastic polymer films distributing stress over a wider area under everyday loading conditions.

Screen protectors' surface can be glossy or matte. Glossy protectors retain the display's original clarity, while a matte ("anti-glare") surface facilitates readability in bright environments and mitigates stains such as fingerprints.

== Disadvantages ==
Screen protectors have been known to interfere with the operation of some touchscreens. Also, an existing oleophobic coating of a touchscreen will be covered, although some tempered glass screen protectors come with their own oleophobic coating.

On some devices, the thickness of screen protectors can affect the look and feel of the device.

== See also ==
- Smartphone
- Mobile phone accessories § Cases
