= Mobile phone accessories =

Accessories for mobile phones

Smartphones with a stylus

Mobile accessories include any hardware that is not integral to the operation of a mobile smartphone as designed by the manufacturer. Its purpose is to protect the mobile from being damaged or to use for more convenient use of the mobile. People can choose whether to use these accessories for their mobile, as they are not a necessity.

== Cases ==
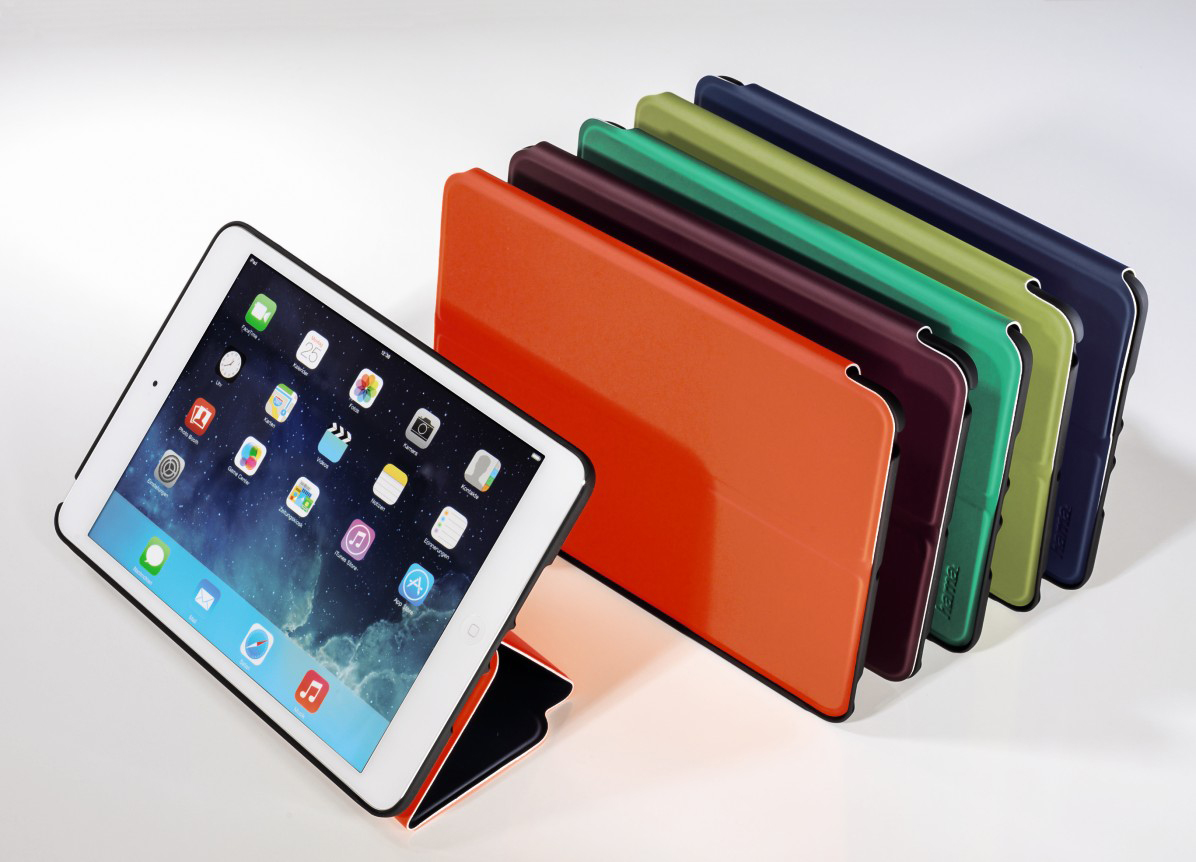
Combination case with front cover that can be folded into a horizontal stand

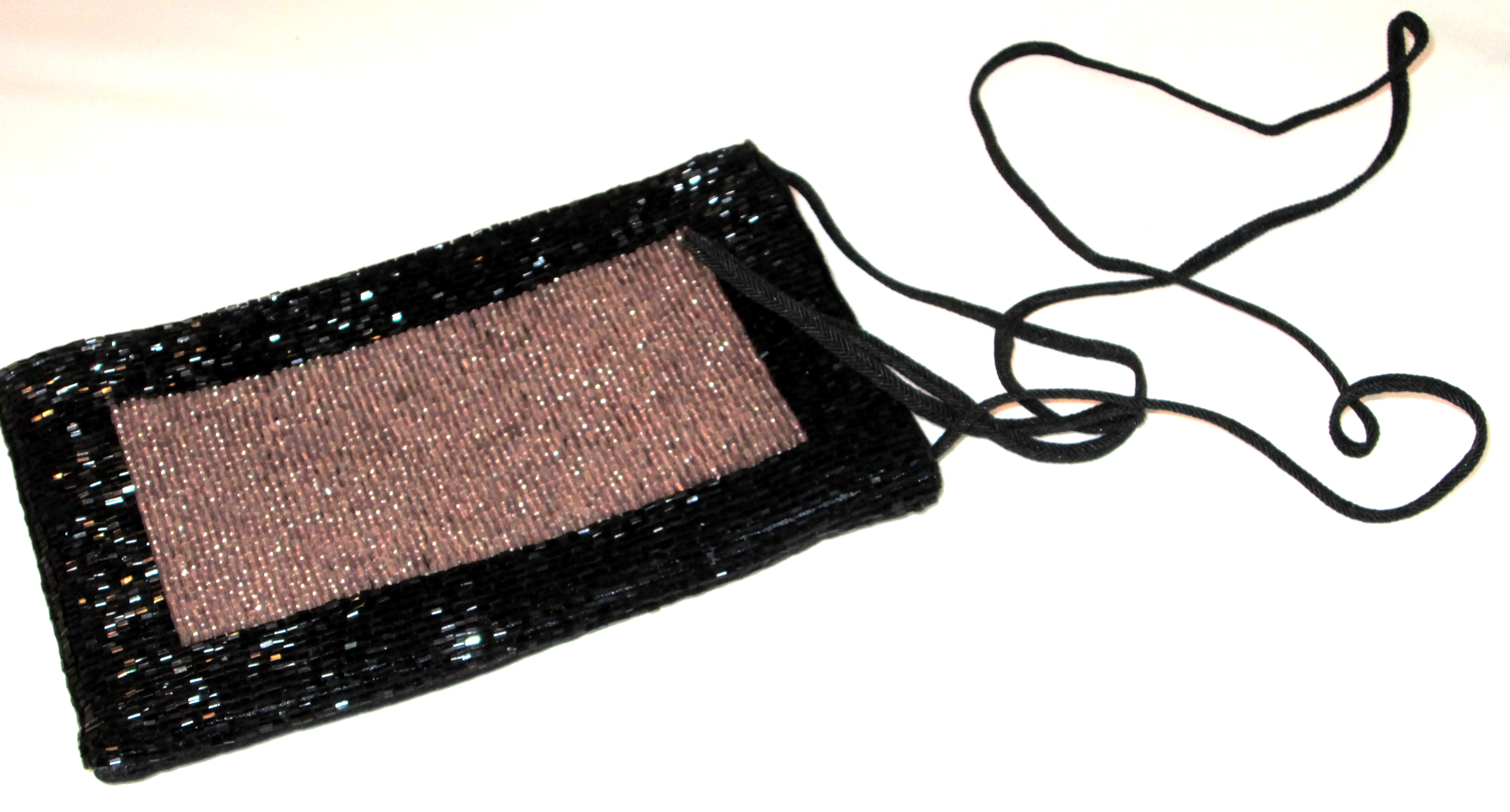
Pouch case made to dangle

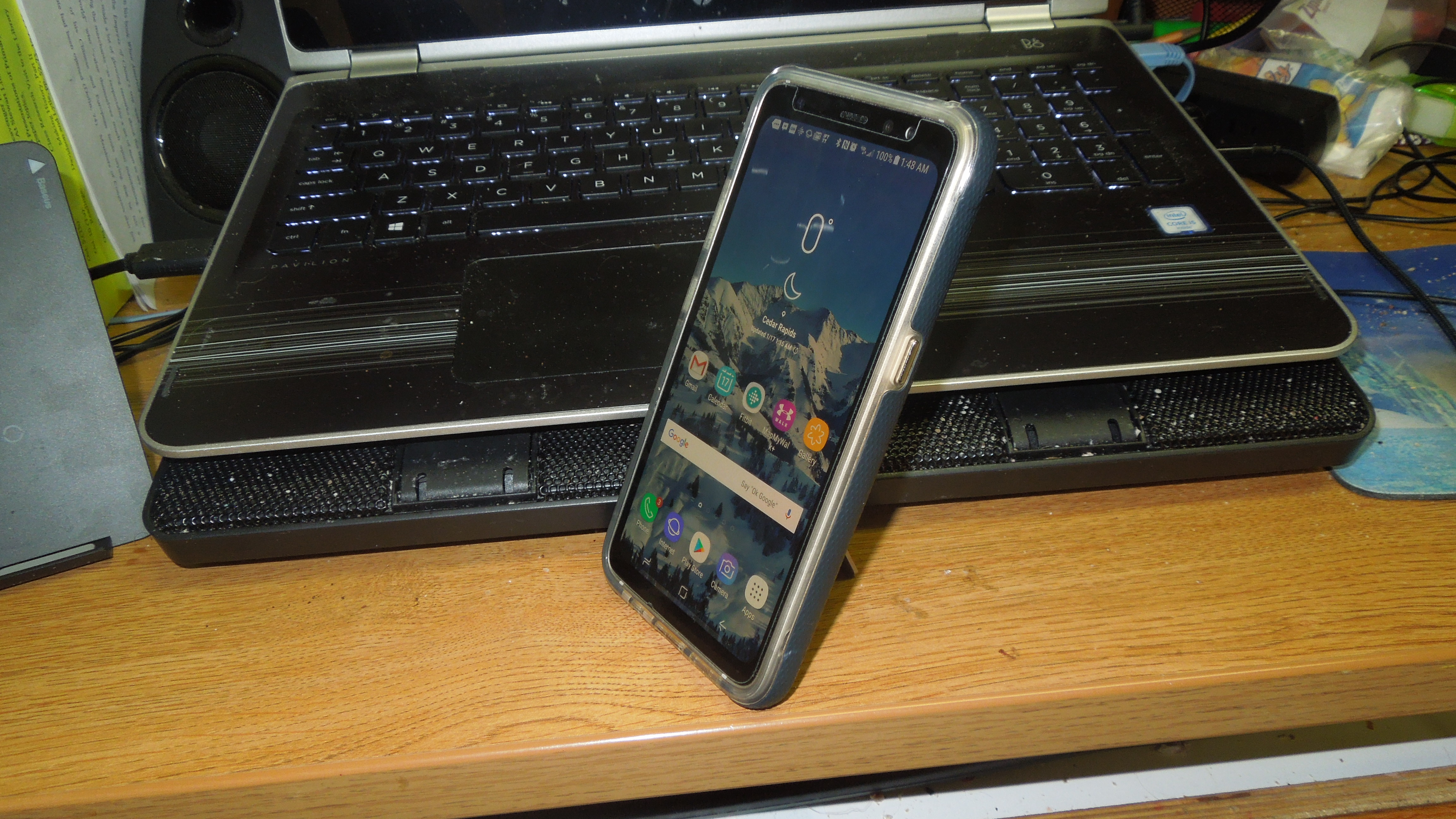
A Samsung Galaxy S8 Active in a combined case and collapsible vertical stand

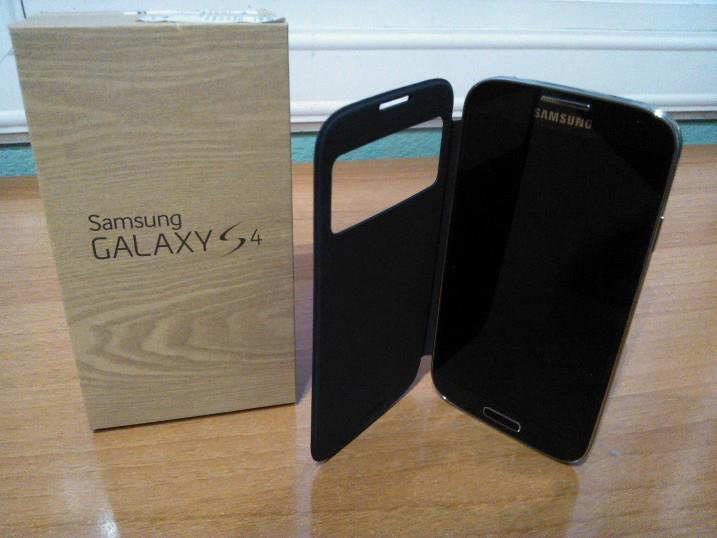
S-View cover accessory of a Samsung Galaxy S4: Horizontal flip cover with preview window

Cases, which are designed to attach to, support, or otherwise hold a smartphone, are popular accessories. Case measures are based on the display inches (e.g. 5 inch display). There are different types:

- Pouches and sleeves
- Holsters
- Shells
- Skins
- Fitted cases
- Bumpers
- Flip cases and wallets
- Screen protection films
- Camera protection films
- Drop and shock protection
- Leather cases
- Carbon fiber cases
- Metal cases
- Magnetic cases
- Cases with integrated kick stands
- Battery cases
- Cases with protection devices

Holsters are commonly used as third-party cases for devices, and/or are made of plastic and without exposed rigid corners. Heavy duty cases are designed to protect from drops and scratches.

A standing (or kickstand) case keeps the device standing upright. The collapsible kickstand of some horizontal cases holds the device in a flatter or steeper angle, depending on whether it is horizontally placed on a surface clockwise or counter-clockwise. The flat angle allows tapping without pushing the device over, while the steep angle is intended for watching.

Folio cases are a combination of a case and stand, and may include a keyboard (USB for OTG smartphones or bluetooth keyboard).

Third-party cases and design covers can serve for protection and personalization. These are the result of the relatively "naked" designs produced by manufacturers such as Apple, where the metal and glass components of the device are exposed and vulnerable to damage. They are distinct from holsters, in allowing use of the device while in the case, but in many instances include a belt clip or other device giving it the functionality of a holster. They are made of plastic, rubber, silicone, leather, or adhesive-backed vinyl pieces. Vinyl material may be calendered or cast, with the latter being more expensive. Calendered vinyl is expected to only be used for short-mid duration (10 years), while cast vinyl is used on a more long-term basis. Calendered vinyl also tends to shrink in the heat and can be shaped into any form (above 80 degrees Celsius), and may fade in direct sunlight.

Customized phone cases use custom printing. Different companies have different methods of printing on cases; some utilize sublimation, others Inkjet-printed skins, others dye-sublimation 3D printing methods.

Functional cases can integrate external batteries or a USB, bluetooth, or Wifi keyboard and touchpad.

== Anti-loss devices ==
Anti-loss keychains can easily locate a smartphone through the GPS and Bluetooth low energy antennas of the phone. Once the user is within range of the smartphone, both the smartphone and device will alert the user. It also can be used to remotely take photographs using Bluetooth.

== Phone charms ==
Phone charms are used to decorate the device. They attach either by a strap or by plugging into the jack plug.

== Mass storage ==
Some smartphones feature SD card slots (usually the smaller Micro-SD variant). These, in combination with a compatible SD card, can be used to transfer files from one device to another, or simply to increase the storage capacity of the phone.

Wi-Fi SDs are Wi-Fi communication devices on a special SD card inserted into the SD card slot. They can move pictures to a local computer or an online photo-sharing service.

Additionally, many devices have USB On-The-Go and support USB storage, in most cases using either a special USB micro-B flash drive or an adapter for a standard USB port. Such adapters can also be used with various other USB devices, such as hardware mice and keyboards.

== Chargers and charging cables ==
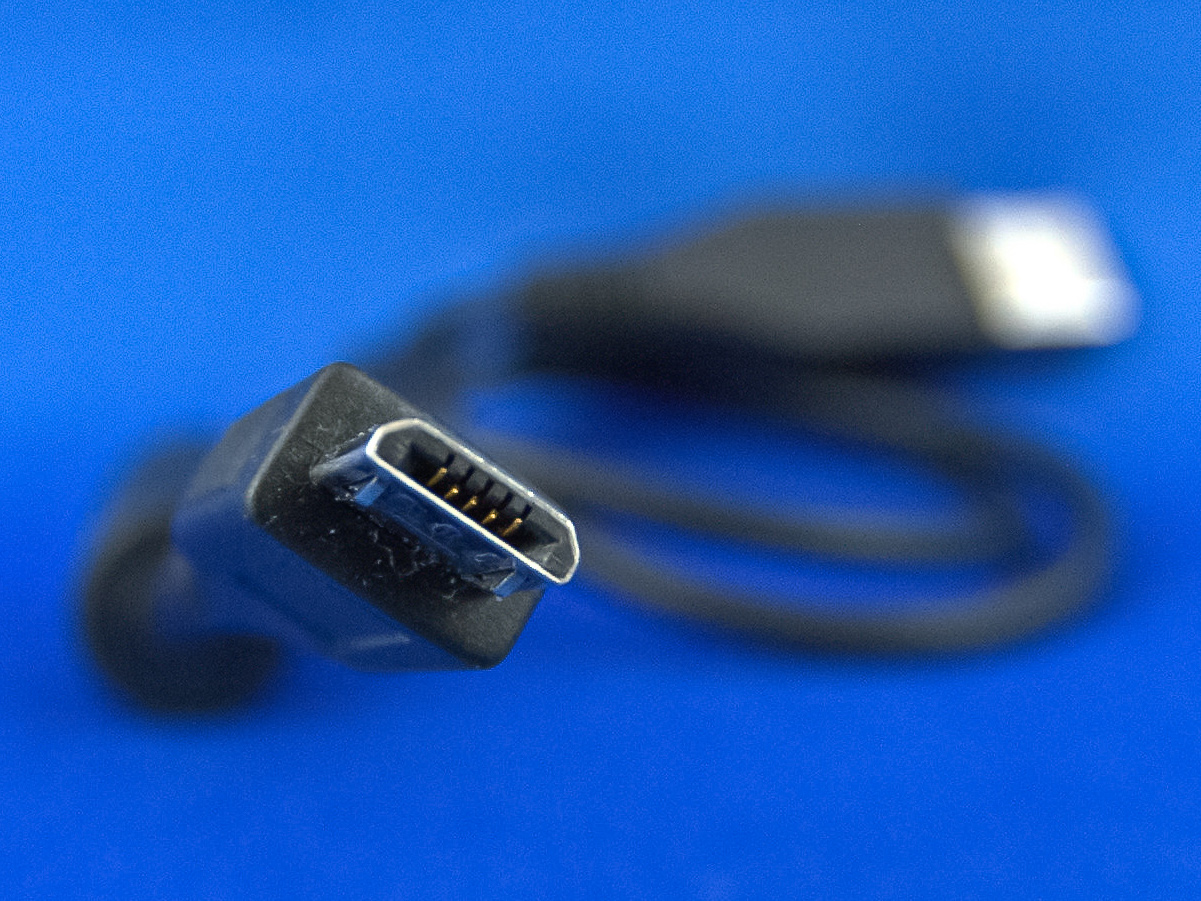
Micro-B USB plug

Mobile phone chargers have gone through a diverse evolution that has included cradles, plug-in cords and obscure connectors. However, devices built between 2010 and 2020 generally use micro-USB connectors, while newer devices tend to use USB-C, especially in Europe. Apple devices often use proprietary connectors.

External batteries are most commonly stand-alone devices, which can be cabled to the phone's primary charging connector.

== Photo accessories ==
Smart lenses are larger and more capable than the phone's camera, having optical zoom and other features. The smartphone connects to them over Wi-Fi using an app. They are compatible with most smartphones. Smart flash can be used also for selfies.

== Selfie stick ==
Selfie sticks are hand-held extensible monopods used to move the devices further away than would have been possible with the reach of the human arm, allowing for the camera to take shots to be taken at angles and distances that would not have been possible before.

== Phone stands ==
A phone stand keeps the device standing upright on the desk.

== Power banks ==
A Power bank is portable device that store electrical engery and is used to charge mobile phones, tablets and wireless devices. These power banks are in multiple size, design and capacity for example 5000 watts to 26000 watts.

== Smartphone tripod mount ==
A tripod; it is designed to hold the device in place in a fixed location on the ground during the capture of photographs.

== HDMI and projector ==
Micro-USB to HDMI cables are used in smartphones with MHL.

== Phone coolers ==
External device designed to cool down a phone for maintaining or improving performance (SoC, battery lifespan, charging speed). May include heatsink, axial or centrifugal fan(s), heat pipes, vapor chamber, peltier, water-to-air heat exchangers, magsafe, wireless charging and/or programmable rgb lighting.

== Additional buttons ==
Pressy Button is a programmable button that can be inserted into the headphone socket of a smartphone or tablet and used as an extra button to perform tasks on the device.

== See also ==
- Modular smartphone
- Near field communication
- Phone theme
- Screen protector
- Smart camera
- Smart band
